

424001–424100 

|-bgcolor=#fefefe
| 424001 ||  || — || September 30, 2006 || Mount Lemmon || Mount Lemmon Survey || MAS || align=right data-sort-value="0.56" | 560 m || 
|-id=002 bgcolor=#fefefe
| 424002 ||  || — || November 12, 2006 || Mount Lemmon || Mount Lemmon Survey || — || align=right data-sort-value="0.75" | 750 m || 
|-id=003 bgcolor=#FA8072
| 424003 ||  || — || November 21, 2006 || Mount Lemmon || Mount Lemmon Survey || — || align=right | 1.5 km || 
|-id=004 bgcolor=#E9E9E9
| 424004 ||  || — || November 16, 2006 || Kitt Peak || Spacewatch || (5) || align=right data-sort-value="0.68" | 680 m || 
|-id=005 bgcolor=#E9E9E9
| 424005 ||  || — || November 16, 2006 || Kitt Peak || Spacewatch || — || align=right data-sort-value="0.92" | 920 m || 
|-id=006 bgcolor=#fefefe
| 424006 ||  || — || November 11, 2006 || Kitt Peak || Spacewatch || — || align=right data-sort-value="0.74" | 740 m || 
|-id=007 bgcolor=#E9E9E9
| 424007 ||  || — || October 20, 2006 || Mount Lemmon || Mount Lemmon Survey || — || align=right | 1.1 km || 
|-id=008 bgcolor=#fefefe
| 424008 ||  || — || November 18, 2006 || Socorro || LINEAR || — || align=right data-sort-value="0.88" | 880 m || 
|-id=009 bgcolor=#E9E9E9
| 424009 ||  || — || November 12, 2006 || Mount Lemmon || Mount Lemmon Survey || — || align=right | 1.0 km || 
|-id=010 bgcolor=#fefefe
| 424010 ||  || — || November 19, 2006 || Kitt Peak || Spacewatch || — || align=right data-sort-value="0.75" | 750 m || 
|-id=011 bgcolor=#fefefe
| 424011 ||  || — || November 19, 2006 || Socorro || LINEAR || — || align=right data-sort-value="0.93" | 930 m || 
|-id=012 bgcolor=#fefefe
| 424012 ||  || — || November 11, 2006 || Kitt Peak || Spacewatch || — || align=right data-sort-value="0.90" | 900 m || 
|-id=013 bgcolor=#fefefe
| 424013 ||  || — || September 30, 2006 || Mount Lemmon || Mount Lemmon Survey || — || align=right data-sort-value="0.71" | 710 m || 
|-id=014 bgcolor=#fefefe
| 424014 ||  || — || October 19, 2006 || Catalina || CSS || V || align=right data-sort-value="0.63" | 630 m || 
|-id=015 bgcolor=#fefefe
| 424015 ||  || — || October 28, 2006 || Kitt Peak || Spacewatch || — || align=right data-sort-value="0.83" | 830 m || 
|-id=016 bgcolor=#fefefe
| 424016 ||  || — || November 20, 2006 || Kitt Peak || Spacewatch || — || align=right | 1.0 km || 
|-id=017 bgcolor=#fefefe
| 424017 ||  || — || October 22, 2006 || Mount Lemmon || Mount Lemmon Survey || — || align=right data-sort-value="0.71" | 710 m || 
|-id=018 bgcolor=#fefefe
| 424018 ||  || — || November 29, 2006 || Socorro || LINEAR || — || align=right data-sort-value="0.70" | 700 m || 
|-id=019 bgcolor=#E9E9E9
| 424019 ||  || — || December 9, 2006 || Kitt Peak || Spacewatch || — || align=right data-sort-value="0.92" | 920 m || 
|-id=020 bgcolor=#fefefe
| 424020 ||  || — || December 10, 2006 || Kitt Peak || Spacewatch || — || align=right data-sort-value="0.92" | 920 m || 
|-id=021 bgcolor=#fefefe
| 424021 ||  || — || December 10, 2006 || Kitt Peak || Spacewatch || — || align=right | 1.00 km || 
|-id=022 bgcolor=#E9E9E9
| 424022 ||  || — || November 22, 2006 || Socorro || LINEAR || — || align=right | 1.5 km || 
|-id=023 bgcolor=#fefefe
| 424023 ||  || — || October 21, 2006 || Mount Lemmon || Mount Lemmon Survey || H || align=right data-sort-value="0.91" | 910 m || 
|-id=024 bgcolor=#fefefe
| 424024 ||  || — || November 1, 2006 || Mount Lemmon || Mount Lemmon Survey || — || align=right data-sort-value="0.86" | 860 m || 
|-id=025 bgcolor=#E9E9E9
| 424025 ||  || — || December 13, 2006 || Catalina || CSS || — || align=right data-sort-value="0.78" | 780 m || 
|-id=026 bgcolor=#fefefe
| 424026 ||  || — || November 27, 2006 || Mount Lemmon || Mount Lemmon Survey || — || align=right data-sort-value="0.82" | 820 m || 
|-id=027 bgcolor=#E9E9E9
| 424027 ||  || — || December 15, 2006 || Mount Lemmon || Mount Lemmon Survey || — || align=right | 2.0 km || 
|-id=028 bgcolor=#fefefe
| 424028 ||  || — || December 11, 2006 || Kitt Peak || Spacewatch || — || align=right | 1.3 km || 
|-id=029 bgcolor=#fefefe
| 424029 ||  || — || December 13, 2006 || Mount Lemmon || Mount Lemmon Survey || — || align=right data-sort-value="0.84" | 840 m || 
|-id=030 bgcolor=#E9E9E9
| 424030 ||  || — || December 20, 2006 || Palomar || NEAT || — || align=right | 1.1 km || 
|-id=031 bgcolor=#fefefe
| 424031 ||  || — || December 23, 2006 || Eskridge || Farpoint Obs. || MAS || align=right data-sort-value="0.69" | 690 m || 
|-id=032 bgcolor=#fefefe
| 424032 ||  || — || December 10, 2006 || Kitt Peak || Spacewatch || NYS || align=right data-sort-value="0.68" | 680 m || 
|-id=033 bgcolor=#E9E9E9
| 424033 ||  || — || November 22, 2006 || Mount Lemmon || Mount Lemmon Survey || — || align=right | 2.9 km || 
|-id=034 bgcolor=#fefefe
| 424034 ||  || — || November 25, 2006 || Mount Lemmon || Mount Lemmon Survey || — || align=right data-sort-value="0.97" | 970 m || 
|-id=035 bgcolor=#fefefe
| 424035 ||  || — || December 24, 2006 || Mount Lemmon || Mount Lemmon Survey || — || align=right data-sort-value="0.90" | 900 m || 
|-id=036 bgcolor=#fefefe
| 424036 ||  || — || November 18, 2006 || Mount Lemmon || Mount Lemmon Survey || — || align=right data-sort-value="0.94" | 940 m || 
|-id=037 bgcolor=#fefefe
| 424037 ||  || — || January 9, 2007 || Kitt Peak || Spacewatch || H || align=right | 1.0 km || 
|-id=038 bgcolor=#fefefe
| 424038 ||  || — || January 10, 2007 || Kitt Peak || Spacewatch || — || align=right | 1.2 km || 
|-id=039 bgcolor=#fefefe
| 424039 ||  || — || November 27, 2006 || Mount Lemmon || Mount Lemmon Survey || — || align=right | 1.0 km || 
|-id=040 bgcolor=#fefefe
| 424040 ||  || — || January 10, 2007 || Kitt Peak || Spacewatch || H || align=right data-sort-value="0.57" | 570 m || 
|-id=041 bgcolor=#fefefe
| 424041 ||  || — || January 8, 2007 || Mount Lemmon || Mount Lemmon Survey || — || align=right data-sort-value="0.75" | 750 m || 
|-id=042 bgcolor=#fefefe
| 424042 ||  || — || January 10, 2007 || Antares || ARO || MAS || align=right data-sort-value="0.68" | 680 m || 
|-id=043 bgcolor=#fefefe
| 424043 ||  || — || October 23, 2006 || Mount Lemmon || Mount Lemmon Survey || — || align=right data-sort-value="0.86" | 860 m || 
|-id=044 bgcolor=#E9E9E9
| 424044 ||  || — || January 17, 2007 || Palomar || NEAT || — || align=right | 2.3 km || 
|-id=045 bgcolor=#E9E9E9
| 424045 ||  || — || January 10, 2007 || Kitt Peak || Spacewatch || — || align=right data-sort-value="0.80" | 800 m || 
|-id=046 bgcolor=#E9E9E9
| 424046 ||  || — || January 17, 2007 || Kitt Peak || Spacewatch || — || align=right | 1.1 km || 
|-id=047 bgcolor=#fefefe
| 424047 ||  || — || December 13, 2006 || Mount Lemmon || Mount Lemmon Survey || — || align=right data-sort-value="0.87" | 870 m || 
|-id=048 bgcolor=#fefefe
| 424048 ||  || — || January 10, 2007 || Kitt Peak || Spacewatch || NYS || align=right data-sort-value="0.72" | 720 m || 
|-id=049 bgcolor=#fefefe
| 424049 ||  || — || January 24, 2007 || Catalina || CSS || — || align=right data-sort-value="0.87" | 870 m || 
|-id=050 bgcolor=#fefefe
| 424050 ||  || — || January 24, 2007 || Catalina || CSS || H || align=right data-sort-value="0.85" | 850 m || 
|-id=051 bgcolor=#fefefe
| 424051 ||  || — || January 24, 2007 || Mount Lemmon || Mount Lemmon Survey || — || align=right data-sort-value="0.90" | 900 m || 
|-id=052 bgcolor=#E9E9E9
| 424052 ||  || — || December 21, 2006 || Kitt Peak || Spacewatch || (5) || align=right data-sort-value="0.88" | 880 m || 
|-id=053 bgcolor=#E9E9E9
| 424053 ||  || — || January 27, 2007 || Mount Lemmon || Mount Lemmon Survey || — || align=right data-sort-value="0.85" | 850 m || 
|-id=054 bgcolor=#E9E9E9
| 424054 ||  || — || January 27, 2007 || Kitt Peak || Spacewatch || — || align=right data-sort-value="0.99" | 990 m || 
|-id=055 bgcolor=#E9E9E9
| 424055 ||  || — || January 28, 2007 || Mount Lemmon || Mount Lemmon Survey || — || align=right | 1.3 km || 
|-id=056 bgcolor=#fefefe
| 424056 ||  || — || January 24, 2007 || Mount Lemmon || Mount Lemmon Survey || — || align=right data-sort-value="0.83" | 830 m || 
|-id=057 bgcolor=#E9E9E9
| 424057 ||  || — || January 27, 2007 || Catalina || CSS || — || align=right | 1.2 km || 
|-id=058 bgcolor=#E9E9E9
| 424058 ||  || — || January 27, 2007 || Kitt Peak || Spacewatch || — || align=right | 2.1 km || 
|-id=059 bgcolor=#E9E9E9
| 424059 ||  || — || January 26, 2007 || Kitt Peak || Spacewatch || — || align=right data-sort-value="0.95" | 950 m || 
|-id=060 bgcolor=#E9E9E9
| 424060 ||  || — || February 7, 2007 || Kitt Peak || Spacewatch || — || align=right | 1.1 km || 
|-id=061 bgcolor=#E9E9E9
| 424061 ||  || — || January 27, 2007 || Mount Lemmon || Mount Lemmon Survey || — || align=right | 2.9 km || 
|-id=062 bgcolor=#E9E9E9
| 424062 ||  || — || November 24, 2006 || Mount Lemmon || Mount Lemmon Survey || — || align=right | 1.7 km || 
|-id=063 bgcolor=#E9E9E9
| 424063 ||  || — || February 8, 2007 || Mount Lemmon || Mount Lemmon Survey || — || align=right | 1.4 km || 
|-id=064 bgcolor=#E9E9E9
| 424064 ||  || — || February 15, 2007 || Charleston || ARO || — || align=right data-sort-value="0.65" | 650 m || 
|-id=065 bgcolor=#fefefe
| 424065 ||  || — || February 15, 2007 || Palomar || NEAT || H || align=right data-sort-value="0.91" | 910 m || 
|-id=066 bgcolor=#fefefe
| 424066 ||  || — || January 28, 2007 || Mount Lemmon || Mount Lemmon Survey || H || align=right data-sort-value="0.88" | 880 m || 
|-id=067 bgcolor=#E9E9E9
| 424067 ||  || — || January 27, 2007 || Mount Lemmon || Mount Lemmon Survey || — || align=right | 1.1 km || 
|-id=068 bgcolor=#E9E9E9
| 424068 ||  || — || December 15, 2006 || Mount Lemmon || Mount Lemmon Survey || — || align=right data-sort-value="0.91" | 910 m || 
|-id=069 bgcolor=#E9E9E9
| 424069 ||  || — || February 16, 2007 || Mount Lemmon || Mount Lemmon Survey || (5) || align=right data-sort-value="0.65" | 650 m || 
|-id=070 bgcolor=#E9E9E9
| 424070 ||  || — || February 16, 2007 || Mount Lemmon || Mount Lemmon Survey || — || align=right | 1.3 km || 
|-id=071 bgcolor=#E9E9E9
| 424071 ||  || — || February 17, 2007 || Kitt Peak || Spacewatch || EUN || align=right | 1.3 km || 
|-id=072 bgcolor=#fefefe
| 424072 ||  || — || February 17, 2007 || Kitt Peak || Spacewatch || — || align=right data-sort-value="0.96" | 960 m || 
|-id=073 bgcolor=#E9E9E9
| 424073 ||  || — || January 28, 2007 || Mount Lemmon || Mount Lemmon Survey || — || align=right data-sort-value="0.98" | 980 m || 
|-id=074 bgcolor=#E9E9E9
| 424074 ||  || — || February 17, 2007 || Kitt Peak || Spacewatch || — || align=right | 1.5 km || 
|-id=075 bgcolor=#E9E9E9
| 424075 ||  || — || January 27, 2007 || Mount Lemmon || Mount Lemmon Survey || — || align=right | 1.2 km || 
|-id=076 bgcolor=#E9E9E9
| 424076 ||  || — || February 17, 2007 || Kitt Peak || Spacewatch || — || align=right data-sort-value="0.87" | 870 m || 
|-id=077 bgcolor=#E9E9E9
| 424077 ||  || — || February 17, 2007 || Kitt Peak || Spacewatch || (5) || align=right data-sort-value="0.76" | 760 m || 
|-id=078 bgcolor=#E9E9E9
| 424078 ||  || — || February 17, 2007 || Kitt Peak || Spacewatch || — || align=right | 1.3 km || 
|-id=079 bgcolor=#fefefe
| 424079 ||  || — || February 17, 2007 || Kitt Peak || Spacewatch || — || align=right data-sort-value="0.94" | 940 m || 
|-id=080 bgcolor=#E9E9E9
| 424080 ||  || — || February 17, 2007 || Kitt Peak || Spacewatch || — || align=right | 1.4 km || 
|-id=081 bgcolor=#E9E9E9
| 424081 ||  || — || February 9, 2007 || Kitt Peak || Spacewatch || — || align=right | 1.6 km || 
|-id=082 bgcolor=#fefefe
| 424082 ||  || — || December 13, 2006 || Kitt Peak || Spacewatch || — || align=right data-sort-value="0.82" | 820 m || 
|-id=083 bgcolor=#E9E9E9
| 424083 ||  || — || February 21, 2007 || Catalina || CSS || — || align=right | 2.0 km || 
|-id=084 bgcolor=#fefefe
| 424084 ||  || — || January 28, 2007 || Mount Lemmon || Mount Lemmon Survey || H || align=right data-sort-value="0.75" | 750 m || 
|-id=085 bgcolor=#E9E9E9
| 424085 ||  || — || February 19, 2007 || Mount Lemmon || Mount Lemmon Survey || — || align=right | 2.1 km || 
|-id=086 bgcolor=#E9E9E9
| 424086 ||  || — || February 21, 2007 || Kitt Peak || Spacewatch || — || align=right | 1.2 km || 
|-id=087 bgcolor=#E9E9E9
| 424087 ||  || — || February 21, 2007 || Kitt Peak || Spacewatch || (5) || align=right data-sort-value="0.56" | 560 m || 
|-id=088 bgcolor=#fefefe
| 424088 ||  || — || February 23, 2007 || Catalina || CSS || H || align=right data-sort-value="0.68" | 680 m || 
|-id=089 bgcolor=#FFC2E0
| 424089 ||  || — || February 25, 2007 || Mount Lemmon || Mount Lemmon Survey || AMO +1km || align=right | 1.1 km || 
|-id=090 bgcolor=#fefefe
| 424090 ||  || — || February 26, 2007 || Catalina || CSS || H || align=right data-sort-value="0.68" | 680 m || 
|-id=091 bgcolor=#E9E9E9
| 424091 ||  || — || February 17, 2007 || Kitt Peak || Spacewatch || — || align=right | 1.9 km || 
|-id=092 bgcolor=#E9E9E9
| 424092 ||  || — || February 23, 2007 || Mount Lemmon || Mount Lemmon Survey || — || align=right data-sort-value="0.84" | 840 m || 
|-id=093 bgcolor=#E9E9E9
| 424093 ||  || — || February 26, 2007 || Mount Lemmon || Mount Lemmon Survey || — || align=right | 1.3 km || 
|-id=094 bgcolor=#E9E9E9
| 424094 ||  || — || March 9, 2007 || Mount Lemmon || Mount Lemmon Survey || — || align=right data-sort-value="0.88" | 880 m || 
|-id=095 bgcolor=#E9E9E9
| 424095 ||  || — || February 25, 2007 || Mount Lemmon || Mount Lemmon Survey || — || align=right | 1.0 km || 
|-id=096 bgcolor=#fefefe
| 424096 ||  || — || February 8, 2007 || Kitt Peak || Spacewatch || — || align=right data-sort-value="0.80" | 800 m || 
|-id=097 bgcolor=#E9E9E9
| 424097 ||  || — || March 9, 2007 || Palomar || NEAT || — || align=right data-sort-value="0.83" | 830 m || 
|-id=098 bgcolor=#E9E9E9
| 424098 ||  || — || February 17, 2007 || Kitt Peak || Spacewatch || — || align=right | 2.0 km || 
|-id=099 bgcolor=#E9E9E9
| 424099 ||  || — || March 9, 2007 || Kitt Peak || Spacewatch || — || align=right data-sort-value="0.94" | 940 m || 
|-id=100 bgcolor=#fefefe
| 424100 ||  || — || March 10, 2007 || Mount Lemmon || Mount Lemmon Survey || — || align=right data-sort-value="0.67" | 670 m || 
|}

424101–424200 

|-bgcolor=#E9E9E9
| 424101 ||  || — || March 10, 2007 || Mount Lemmon || Mount Lemmon Survey || — || align=right | 1.6 km || 
|-id=102 bgcolor=#C2FFFF
| 424102 ||  || — || March 11, 2007 || Altschwendt || W. Ries || L5 || align=right | 8.4 km || 
|-id=103 bgcolor=#E9E9E9
| 424103 ||  || — || August 28, 2005 || Kitt Peak || Spacewatch || — || align=right | 1.2 km || 
|-id=104 bgcolor=#fefefe
| 424104 ||  || — || March 9, 2007 || Kitt Peak || Spacewatch || H || align=right data-sort-value="0.67" | 670 m || 
|-id=105 bgcolor=#E9E9E9
| 424105 ||  || — || March 9, 2007 || Mount Lemmon || Mount Lemmon Survey || — || align=right data-sort-value="0.88" | 880 m || 
|-id=106 bgcolor=#E9E9E9
| 424106 ||  || — || February 9, 2007 || Kitt Peak || Spacewatch || MAR || align=right | 1.0 km || 
|-id=107 bgcolor=#E9E9E9
| 424107 ||  || — || March 10, 2007 || Kitt Peak || Spacewatch || — || align=right data-sort-value="0.82" | 820 m || 
|-id=108 bgcolor=#E9E9E9
| 424108 ||  || — || March 10, 2007 || Kitt Peak || Spacewatch || — || align=right data-sort-value="0.71" | 710 m || 
|-id=109 bgcolor=#E9E9E9
| 424109 ||  || — || March 12, 2007 || Kitt Peak || Spacewatch || — || align=right | 1.4 km || 
|-id=110 bgcolor=#E9E9E9
| 424110 ||  || — || March 9, 2007 || Mount Lemmon || Mount Lemmon Survey || — || align=right | 1.5 km || 
|-id=111 bgcolor=#E9E9E9
| 424111 ||  || — || March 10, 2007 || Mount Lemmon || Mount Lemmon Survey || — || align=right data-sort-value="0.61" | 610 m || 
|-id=112 bgcolor=#E9E9E9
| 424112 ||  || — || March 10, 2007 || Mount Lemmon || Mount Lemmon Survey || — || align=right data-sort-value="0.92" | 920 m || 
|-id=113 bgcolor=#E9E9E9
| 424113 ||  || — || March 11, 2007 || Kitt Peak || Spacewatch || — || align=right data-sort-value="0.84" | 840 m || 
|-id=114 bgcolor=#E9E9E9
| 424114 ||  || — || March 11, 2007 || Kitt Peak || Spacewatch || — || align=right data-sort-value="0.71" | 710 m || 
|-id=115 bgcolor=#E9E9E9
| 424115 ||  || — || March 11, 2007 || Kitt Peak || Spacewatch || — || align=right | 1.8 km || 
|-id=116 bgcolor=#E9E9E9
| 424116 ||  || — || March 11, 2007 || Kitt Peak || Spacewatch || — || align=right | 2.0 km || 
|-id=117 bgcolor=#E9E9E9
| 424117 ||  || — || January 27, 2007 || Mount Lemmon || Mount Lemmon Survey || — || align=right data-sort-value="0.93" | 930 m || 
|-id=118 bgcolor=#E9E9E9
| 424118 ||  || — || March 13, 2007 || Mount Lemmon || Mount Lemmon Survey || EUN || align=right | 1.2 km || 
|-id=119 bgcolor=#E9E9E9
| 424119 ||  || — || March 13, 2007 || Mount Lemmon || Mount Lemmon Survey || — || align=right | 1.2 km || 
|-id=120 bgcolor=#E9E9E9
| 424120 ||  || — || March 13, 2007 || Mount Lemmon || Mount Lemmon Survey || — || align=right data-sort-value="0.75" | 750 m || 
|-id=121 bgcolor=#E9E9E9
| 424121 ||  || — || March 11, 2007 || Kitt Peak || Spacewatch || — || align=right | 1.3 km || 
|-id=122 bgcolor=#E9E9E9
| 424122 ||  || — || March 12, 2007 || Mount Lemmon || Mount Lemmon Survey || — || align=right | 2.2 km || 
|-id=123 bgcolor=#E9E9E9
| 424123 ||  || — || February 26, 2007 || Mount Lemmon || Mount Lemmon Survey || — || align=right | 1.9 km || 
|-id=124 bgcolor=#E9E9E9
| 424124 ||  || — || March 12, 2007 || Mount Lemmon || Mount Lemmon Survey || — || align=right | 2.3 km || 
|-id=125 bgcolor=#E9E9E9
| 424125 ||  || — || March 14, 2007 || Kitt Peak || Spacewatch || — || align=right | 2.3 km || 
|-id=126 bgcolor=#E9E9E9
| 424126 ||  || — || March 14, 2007 || Kitt Peak || Spacewatch || — || align=right | 2.7 km || 
|-id=127 bgcolor=#E9E9E9
| 424127 ||  || — || March 14, 2007 || Kitt Peak || Spacewatch || — || align=right | 3.0 km || 
|-id=128 bgcolor=#E9E9E9
| 424128 ||  || — || March 15, 2007 || Catalina || CSS || — || align=right | 1.3 km || 
|-id=129 bgcolor=#E9E9E9
| 424129 ||  || — || March 12, 2007 || Mount Lemmon || Mount Lemmon Survey || JUN || align=right | 1.2 km || 
|-id=130 bgcolor=#E9E9E9
| 424130 ||  || — || March 14, 2007 || Mount Lemmon || Mount Lemmon Survey || — || align=right | 2.2 km || 
|-id=131 bgcolor=#E9E9E9
| 424131 ||  || — || November 27, 2006 || Mount Lemmon || Mount Lemmon Survey || (194) || align=right | 1.3 km || 
|-id=132 bgcolor=#E9E9E9
| 424132 ||  || — || September 18, 1995 || Kitt Peak || Spacewatch || — || align=right | 2.1 km || 
|-id=133 bgcolor=#E9E9E9
| 424133 ||  || — || March 19, 2007 || Catalina || CSS || — || align=right | 2.3 km || 
|-id=134 bgcolor=#E9E9E9
| 424134 ||  || — || February 26, 2007 || Mount Lemmon || Mount Lemmon Survey || — || align=right | 1.5 km || 
|-id=135 bgcolor=#E9E9E9
| 424135 ||  || — || March 20, 2007 || Kitt Peak || Spacewatch || — || align=right | 1.5 km || 
|-id=136 bgcolor=#E9E9E9
| 424136 ||  || — || March 20, 2007 || Mount Lemmon || Mount Lemmon Survey || — || align=right | 1.0 km || 
|-id=137 bgcolor=#E9E9E9
| 424137 ||  || — || March 26, 2007 || Kitt Peak || Spacewatch || WIT || align=right data-sort-value="0.84" | 840 m || 
|-id=138 bgcolor=#fefefe
| 424138 ||  || — || March 26, 2007 || Catalina || CSS || H || align=right data-sort-value="0.74" | 740 m || 
|-id=139 bgcolor=#E9E9E9
| 424139 ||  || — || March 20, 2007 || Anderson Mesa || LONEOS || — || align=right | 2.8 km || 
|-id=140 bgcolor=#E9E9E9
| 424140 ||  || — || March 26, 2007 || Mount Lemmon || Mount Lemmon Survey || — || align=right | 1.3 km || 
|-id=141 bgcolor=#E9E9E9
| 424141 ||  || — || April 7, 2007 || Mount Lemmon || Mount Lemmon Survey || — || align=right | 1.3 km || 
|-id=142 bgcolor=#E9E9E9
| 424142 ||  || — || March 11, 2007 || Mount Lemmon || Mount Lemmon Survey || — || align=right | 1.6 km || 
|-id=143 bgcolor=#E9E9E9
| 424143 ||  || — || April 7, 2007 || Mount Lemmon || Mount Lemmon Survey || — || align=right | 2.1 km || 
|-id=144 bgcolor=#E9E9E9
| 424144 ||  || — || March 16, 2007 || Mount Lemmon || Mount Lemmon Survey || — || align=right | 1.2 km || 
|-id=145 bgcolor=#E9E9E9
| 424145 ||  || — || April 11, 2007 || Catalina || CSS || — || align=right | 2.2 km || 
|-id=146 bgcolor=#E9E9E9
| 424146 ||  || — || March 17, 2007 || Anderson Mesa || LONEOS || — || align=right | 2.0 km || 
|-id=147 bgcolor=#E9E9E9
| 424147 ||  || — || April 11, 2007 || Kitt Peak || Spacewatch || — || align=right | 1.7 km || 
|-id=148 bgcolor=#E9E9E9
| 424148 ||  || — || April 11, 2007 || Mount Lemmon || Mount Lemmon Survey || MRX || align=right | 1.1 km || 
|-id=149 bgcolor=#E9E9E9
| 424149 ||  || — || April 11, 2007 || Mount Lemmon || Mount Lemmon Survey || — || align=right | 1.9 km || 
|-id=150 bgcolor=#E9E9E9
| 424150 ||  || — || February 25, 2007 || Mount Lemmon || Mount Lemmon Survey || — || align=right | 1.7 km || 
|-id=151 bgcolor=#E9E9E9
| 424151 ||  || — || April 14, 2007 || Kitt Peak || Spacewatch || — || align=right | 2.1 km || 
|-id=152 bgcolor=#E9E9E9
| 424152 ||  || — || April 14, 2007 || Kitt Peak || Spacewatch || — || align=right | 2.2 km || 
|-id=153 bgcolor=#E9E9E9
| 424153 ||  || — || April 14, 2007 || Kitt Peak || Spacewatch || — || align=right | 1.1 km || 
|-id=154 bgcolor=#E9E9E9
| 424154 ||  || — || April 14, 2007 || Kitt Peak || Spacewatch || — || align=right | 1.4 km || 
|-id=155 bgcolor=#E9E9E9
| 424155 ||  || — || April 14, 2007 || Kitt Peak || Spacewatch || — || align=right | 1.8 km || 
|-id=156 bgcolor=#E9E9E9
| 424156 ||  || — || March 15, 2007 || Kitt Peak || Spacewatch || — || align=right | 1.2 km || 
|-id=157 bgcolor=#E9E9E9
| 424157 ||  || — || April 15, 2007 || Kitt Peak || Spacewatch || — || align=right | 1.0 km || 
|-id=158 bgcolor=#E9E9E9
| 424158 ||  || — || April 14, 2007 || Catalina || CSS || — || align=right | 1.9 km || 
|-id=159 bgcolor=#d6d6d6
| 424159 ||  || — || April 14, 2007 || Kitt Peak || Spacewatch || — || align=right | 2.1 km || 
|-id=160 bgcolor=#E9E9E9
| 424160 ||  || — || February 26, 2007 || Mount Lemmon || Mount Lemmon Survey || EUN || align=right | 1.1 km || 
|-id=161 bgcolor=#E9E9E9
| 424161 ||  || — || April 16, 2007 || Catalina || CSS || — || align=right | 1.4 km || 
|-id=162 bgcolor=#E9E9E9
| 424162 ||  || — || April 19, 2007 || Kitt Peak || Spacewatch || — || align=right | 1.4 km || 
|-id=163 bgcolor=#E9E9E9
| 424163 ||  || — || April 18, 2007 || Kitt Peak || Spacewatch || — || align=right | 2.2 km || 
|-id=164 bgcolor=#E9E9E9
| 424164 ||  || — || April 18, 2007 || Kitt Peak || Spacewatch || — || align=right data-sort-value="0.95" | 950 m || 
|-id=165 bgcolor=#E9E9E9
| 424165 ||  || — || April 19, 2007 || Kitt Peak || Spacewatch || — || align=right data-sort-value="0.99" | 990 m || 
|-id=166 bgcolor=#E9E9E9
| 424166 ||  || — || April 20, 2007 || Mount Lemmon || Mount Lemmon Survey || — || align=right | 1.8 km || 
|-id=167 bgcolor=#E9E9E9
| 424167 ||  || — || April 22, 2007 || Mount Lemmon || Mount Lemmon Survey || AGN || align=right | 1.1 km || 
|-id=168 bgcolor=#d6d6d6
| 424168 ||  || — || April 22, 2007 || Mount Lemmon || Mount Lemmon Survey || — || align=right | 2.3 km || 
|-id=169 bgcolor=#E9E9E9
| 424169 ||  || — || April 18, 2007 || Mount Lemmon || Mount Lemmon Survey || — || align=right data-sort-value="0.79" | 790 m || 
|-id=170 bgcolor=#E9E9E9
| 424170 ||  || — || April 18, 2007 || Kitt Peak || Spacewatch || — || align=right | 1.7 km || 
|-id=171 bgcolor=#E9E9E9
| 424171 ||  || — || April 22, 2007 || Kitt Peak || Spacewatch || — || align=right | 2.7 km || 
|-id=172 bgcolor=#E9E9E9
| 424172 ||  || — || April 22, 2007 || Mount Lemmon || Mount Lemmon Survey || JUN || align=right | 1.3 km || 
|-id=173 bgcolor=#E9E9E9
| 424173 ||  || — || April 23, 2007 || Kitt Peak || Spacewatch || — || align=right data-sort-value="0.91" | 910 m || 
|-id=174 bgcolor=#E9E9E9
| 424174 ||  || — || April 23, 2007 || Catalina || CSS || — || align=right | 1.1 km || 
|-id=175 bgcolor=#E9E9E9
| 424175 ||  || — || April 22, 2007 || Kitt Peak || Spacewatch || — || align=right data-sort-value="0.80" | 800 m || 
|-id=176 bgcolor=#E9E9E9
| 424176 ||  || — || April 23, 2007 || Kitt Peak || Spacewatch || — || align=right | 1.6 km || 
|-id=177 bgcolor=#E9E9E9
| 424177 ||  || — || April 24, 2007 || Kitt Peak || Spacewatch || — || align=right | 3.2 km || 
|-id=178 bgcolor=#E9E9E9
| 424178 ||  || — || April 19, 2007 || Mount Lemmon || Mount Lemmon Survey || — || align=right | 1.4 km || 
|-id=179 bgcolor=#E9E9E9
| 424179 ||  || — || April 25, 2007 || Mount Lemmon || Mount Lemmon Survey || — || align=right | 2.7 km || 
|-id=180 bgcolor=#E9E9E9
| 424180 ||  || — || April 25, 2007 || Mount Lemmon || Mount Lemmon Survey || ADE || align=right | 1.9 km || 
|-id=181 bgcolor=#E9E9E9
| 424181 ||  || — || May 7, 2007 || Mount Lemmon || Mount Lemmon Survey || — || align=right | 1.8 km || 
|-id=182 bgcolor=#E9E9E9
| 424182 ||  || — || April 25, 2007 || Kitt Peak || Spacewatch || EUN || align=right | 1.3 km || 
|-id=183 bgcolor=#E9E9E9
| 424183 ||  || — || April 18, 2007 || Mount Lemmon || Mount Lemmon Survey || — || align=right | 1.3 km || 
|-id=184 bgcolor=#d6d6d6
| 424184 ||  || — || October 18, 2003 || Kitt Peak || Spacewatch || — || align=right | 2.7 km || 
|-id=185 bgcolor=#E9E9E9
| 424185 ||  || — || April 18, 2007 || Mount Lemmon || Mount Lemmon Survey || — || align=right | 1.0 km || 
|-id=186 bgcolor=#E9E9E9
| 424186 ||  || — || April 16, 2007 || Catalina || CSS || — || align=right | 2.2 km || 
|-id=187 bgcolor=#E9E9E9
| 424187 ||  || — || April 14, 2007 || Kitt Peak || Spacewatch || — || align=right | 1.3 km || 
|-id=188 bgcolor=#d6d6d6
| 424188 ||  || — || May 10, 2007 || Mount Lemmon || Mount Lemmon Survey || — || align=right | 3.6 km || 
|-id=189 bgcolor=#E9E9E9
| 424189 ||  || — || April 24, 2007 || Mount Lemmon || Mount Lemmon Survey || — || align=right | 1.9 km || 
|-id=190 bgcolor=#E9E9E9
| 424190 ||  || — || April 15, 2007 || Kitt Peak || Spacewatch || — || align=right | 2.6 km || 
|-id=191 bgcolor=#E9E9E9
| 424191 ||  || — || April 15, 2007 || Catalina || CSS || — || align=right | 1.7 km || 
|-id=192 bgcolor=#E9E9E9
| 424192 ||  || — || March 15, 2007 || Mount Lemmon || Mount Lemmon Survey || — || align=right data-sort-value="0.98" | 980 m || 
|-id=193 bgcolor=#d6d6d6
| 424193 ||  || — || May 11, 2007 || Mount Lemmon || Mount Lemmon Survey || EOS || align=right | 1.7 km || 
|-id=194 bgcolor=#d6d6d6
| 424194 ||  || — || June 7, 2007 || Kitt Peak || Spacewatch || — || align=right | 3.0 km || 
|-id=195 bgcolor=#E9E9E9
| 424195 ||  || — || June 9, 2007 || Kitt Peak || Spacewatch || — || align=right | 2.3 km || 
|-id=196 bgcolor=#E9E9E9
| 424196 ||  || — || May 11, 2007 || Kitt Peak || Spacewatch || — || align=right | 2.0 km || 
|-id=197 bgcolor=#E9E9E9
| 424197 ||  || — || June 15, 2007 || Kitt Peak || Spacewatch || — || align=right | 2.8 km || 
|-id=198 bgcolor=#E9E9E9
| 424198 ||  || — || June 10, 2007 || Siding Spring || SSS || — || align=right | 1.9 km || 
|-id=199 bgcolor=#E9E9E9
| 424199 ||  || — || April 16, 2007 || Catalina || CSS || — || align=right | 1.2 km || 
|-id=200 bgcolor=#d6d6d6
| 424200 Tonicelia ||  ||  || July 12, 2007 || La Sagra || OAM Obs. || — || align=right | 3.7 km || 
|}

424201–424300 

|-bgcolor=#d6d6d6
| 424201 ||  || — || July 18, 2007 || Catalina || CSS || Tj (2.96) || align=right | 4.8 km || 
|-id=202 bgcolor=#d6d6d6
| 424202 ||  || — || August 9, 2007 || Socorro || LINEAR || — || align=right | 3.4 km || 
|-id=203 bgcolor=#d6d6d6
| 424203 ||  || — || August 6, 2007 || Reedy Creek || J. Broughton || — || align=right | 3.5 km || 
|-id=204 bgcolor=#d6d6d6
| 424204 ||  || — || August 14, 2007 || Altschwendt || W. Ries || ELF || align=right | 4.6 km || 
|-id=205 bgcolor=#d6d6d6
| 424205 ||  || — || August 8, 2007 || Socorro || LINEAR || — || align=right | 3.3 km || 
|-id=206 bgcolor=#FA8072
| 424206 ||  || — || August 9, 2007 || Socorro || LINEAR || — || align=right data-sort-value="0.64" | 640 m || 
|-id=207 bgcolor=#FA8072
| 424207 ||  || — || August 9, 2007 || Socorro || LINEAR || — || align=right data-sort-value="0.40" | 400 m || 
|-id=208 bgcolor=#d6d6d6
| 424208 || 2007 QY || — || August 17, 2007 || Bisei SG Center || BATTeRS || — || align=right | 4.8 km || 
|-id=209 bgcolor=#d6d6d6
| 424209 ||  || — || August 23, 2007 || Kitt Peak || Spacewatch || — || align=right | 2.7 km || 
|-id=210 bgcolor=#d6d6d6
| 424210 ||  || — || August 23, 2007 || Kitt Peak || Spacewatch || — || align=right | 5.4 km || 
|-id=211 bgcolor=#d6d6d6
| 424211 ||  || — || August 24, 2007 || Kitt Peak || Spacewatch || — || align=right | 3.3 km || 
|-id=212 bgcolor=#d6d6d6
| 424212 ||  || — || September 3, 2007 || Catalina || CSS || — || align=right | 3.0 km || 
|-id=213 bgcolor=#d6d6d6
| 424213 ||  || — || September 3, 2007 || Catalina || CSS || LIX || align=right | 4.0 km || 
|-id=214 bgcolor=#FA8072
| 424214 ||  || — || September 8, 2007 || Anderson Mesa || LONEOS || — || align=right data-sort-value="0.84" | 840 m || 
|-id=215 bgcolor=#fefefe
| 424215 ||  || — || September 8, 2007 || Mount Lemmon || Mount Lemmon Survey || — || align=right data-sort-value="0.55" | 550 m || 
|-id=216 bgcolor=#d6d6d6
| 424216 ||  || — || May 7, 2005 || Mount Lemmon || Mount Lemmon Survey || — || align=right | 2.7 km || 
|-id=217 bgcolor=#d6d6d6
| 424217 ||  || — || September 10, 2007 || Kitt Peak || Spacewatch || — || align=right | 3.2 km || 
|-id=218 bgcolor=#E9E9E9
| 424218 ||  || — || September 10, 2007 || Mount Lemmon || Mount Lemmon Survey || — || align=right | 1.7 km || 
|-id=219 bgcolor=#d6d6d6
| 424219 ||  || — || September 10, 2007 || Mount Lemmon || Mount Lemmon Survey || — || align=right | 2.8 km || 
|-id=220 bgcolor=#d6d6d6
| 424220 ||  || — || September 10, 2007 || Kitt Peak || Spacewatch || — || align=right | 2.8 km || 
|-id=221 bgcolor=#d6d6d6
| 424221 ||  || — || September 11, 2007 || Catalina || CSS || — || align=right | 3.7 km || 
|-id=222 bgcolor=#fefefe
| 424222 ||  || — || September 11, 2007 || Catalina || CSS || — || align=right data-sort-value="0.74" | 740 m || 
|-id=223 bgcolor=#d6d6d6
| 424223 ||  || — || September 11, 2007 || Kitt Peak || Spacewatch || — || align=right | 2.3 km || 
|-id=224 bgcolor=#d6d6d6
| 424224 ||  || — || March 11, 2005 || Kitt Peak || Spacewatch || — || align=right | 2.7 km || 
|-id=225 bgcolor=#d6d6d6
| 424225 ||  || — || September 12, 2007 || Anderson Mesa || LONEOS || — || align=right | 3.7 km || 
|-id=226 bgcolor=#fefefe
| 424226 ||  || — || September 13, 2007 || Socorro || LINEAR || — || align=right data-sort-value="0.64" | 640 m || 
|-id=227 bgcolor=#d6d6d6
| 424227 ||  || — || September 14, 2007 || Socorro || LINEAR || Tj (2.98) || align=right | 3.7 km || 
|-id=228 bgcolor=#d6d6d6
| 424228 ||  || — || September 11, 2007 || Catalina || CSS || — || align=right | 3.7 km || 
|-id=229 bgcolor=#fefefe
| 424229 ||  || — || September 14, 2007 || Catalina || CSS || — || align=right data-sort-value="0.72" | 720 m || 
|-id=230 bgcolor=#E9E9E9
| 424230 ||  || — || September 12, 2007 || Catalina || CSS || — || align=right | 3.8 km || 
|-id=231 bgcolor=#d6d6d6
| 424231 ||  || — || September 10, 2007 || Kitt Peak || Spacewatch || — || align=right | 2.9 km || 
|-id=232 bgcolor=#d6d6d6
| 424232 ||  || — || September 10, 2007 || Kitt Peak || Spacewatch || EOS || align=right | 2.0 km || 
|-id=233 bgcolor=#d6d6d6
| 424233 ||  || — || September 10, 2007 || Kitt Peak || Spacewatch || — || align=right | 2.4 km || 
|-id=234 bgcolor=#d6d6d6
| 424234 ||  || — || August 10, 2007 || Kitt Peak || Spacewatch || — || align=right | 3.1 km || 
|-id=235 bgcolor=#d6d6d6
| 424235 ||  || — || September 11, 2007 || Catalina || CSS || — || align=right | 3.2 km || 
|-id=236 bgcolor=#fefefe
| 424236 ||  || — || September 12, 2007 || Kitt Peak || Spacewatch || — || align=right data-sort-value="0.62" | 620 m || 
|-id=237 bgcolor=#E9E9E9
| 424237 ||  || — || September 13, 2007 || Catalina || CSS || — || align=right | 3.2 km || 
|-id=238 bgcolor=#d6d6d6
| 424238 ||  || — || September 13, 2007 || Catalina || CSS || — || align=right | 4.0 km || 
|-id=239 bgcolor=#d6d6d6
| 424239 ||  || — || September 13, 2007 || Kitt Peak || Spacewatch || — || align=right | 3.2 km || 
|-id=240 bgcolor=#d6d6d6
| 424240 ||  || — || September 10, 2007 || Kitt Peak || Spacewatch || — || align=right | 2.7 km || 
|-id=241 bgcolor=#d6d6d6
| 424241 ||  || — || September 10, 2007 || Kitt Peak || Spacewatch || THM || align=right | 2.3 km || 
|-id=242 bgcolor=#fefefe
| 424242 ||  || — || September 12, 2007 || Kitt Peak || Spacewatch || — || align=right data-sort-value="0.97" | 970 m || 
|-id=243 bgcolor=#d6d6d6
| 424243 ||  || — || September 13, 2007 || Kitt Peak || Spacewatch || — || align=right | 2.5 km || 
|-id=244 bgcolor=#d6d6d6
| 424244 ||  || — || September 12, 2007 || Catalina || CSS || — || align=right | 6.0 km || 
|-id=245 bgcolor=#d6d6d6
| 424245 ||  || — || September 13, 2007 || Mount Lemmon || Mount Lemmon Survey || EOS || align=right | 2.3 km || 
|-id=246 bgcolor=#d6d6d6
| 424246 ||  || — || September 10, 2007 || Kitt Peak || Spacewatch || EOS || align=right | 1.6 km || 
|-id=247 bgcolor=#d6d6d6
| 424247 ||  || — || September 14, 2007 || Catalina || CSS || — || align=right | 3.3 km || 
|-id=248 bgcolor=#d6d6d6
| 424248 ||  || — || September 15, 2007 || Kitt Peak || Spacewatch || — || align=right | 2.7 km || 
|-id=249 bgcolor=#d6d6d6
| 424249 ||  || — || September 6, 2007 || Siding Spring || SSS || Tj (2.99) || align=right | 3.7 km || 
|-id=250 bgcolor=#E9E9E9
| 424250 ||  || — || September 8, 2007 || Anderson Mesa || LONEOS || — || align=right | 2.9 km || 
|-id=251 bgcolor=#d6d6d6
| 424251 ||  || — || September 3, 2007 || Catalina || CSS || — || align=right | 3.6 km || 
|-id=252 bgcolor=#d6d6d6
| 424252 ||  || — || September 9, 2007 || Kitt Peak || Spacewatch || — || align=right | 3.6 km || 
|-id=253 bgcolor=#fefefe
| 424253 ||  || — || September 15, 2007 || Kitt Peak || Spacewatch || — || align=right data-sort-value="0.52" | 520 m || 
|-id=254 bgcolor=#d6d6d6
| 424254 ||  || — || September 12, 2007 || Catalina || CSS || — || align=right | 3.2 km || 
|-id=255 bgcolor=#d6d6d6
| 424255 ||  || — || September 12, 2007 || Mount Lemmon || Mount Lemmon Survey || THM || align=right | 2.6 km || 
|-id=256 bgcolor=#d6d6d6
| 424256 ||  || — || September 9, 2007 || Kitt Peak || Spacewatch || — || align=right | 3.2 km || 
|-id=257 bgcolor=#fefefe
| 424257 ||  || — || September 13, 2007 || Socorro || LINEAR || — || align=right data-sort-value="0.68" | 680 m || 
|-id=258 bgcolor=#d6d6d6
| 424258 ||  || — || September 10, 2007 || Kitt Peak || Spacewatch || — || align=right | 2.6 km || 
|-id=259 bgcolor=#d6d6d6
| 424259 ||  || — || September 19, 2007 || Altschwendt || W. Ries || — || align=right | 4.5 km || 
|-id=260 bgcolor=#d6d6d6
| 424260 ||  || — || September 18, 2007 || Kitt Peak || Spacewatch || — || align=right | 3.0 km || 
|-id=261 bgcolor=#d6d6d6
| 424261 ||  || — || September 10, 2007 || Kitt Peak || Spacewatch || — || align=right | 2.5 km || 
|-id=262 bgcolor=#d6d6d6
| 424262 ||  || — || September 19, 2007 || Kitt Peak || Spacewatch || — || align=right | 3.1 km || 
|-id=263 bgcolor=#d6d6d6
| 424263 ||  || — || September 9, 2007 || Kitt Peak || Spacewatch || — || align=right | 2.8 km || 
|-id=264 bgcolor=#fefefe
| 424264 ||  || — || September 20, 2007 || Catalina || CSS || (2076) || align=right data-sort-value="0.81" | 810 m || 
|-id=265 bgcolor=#fefefe
| 424265 ||  || — || September 30, 2007 || Kitt Peak || Spacewatch || — || align=right data-sort-value="0.67" | 670 m || 
|-id=266 bgcolor=#d6d6d6
| 424266 ||  || — || October 5, 2007 || Pla D'Arguines || R. Ferrando || — || align=right | 2.5 km || 
|-id=267 bgcolor=#d6d6d6
| 424267 ||  || — || September 9, 2007 || Mount Lemmon || Mount Lemmon Survey || EOS || align=right | 2.0 km || 
|-id=268 bgcolor=#fefefe
| 424268 ||  || — || October 5, 2007 || Kitt Peak || Spacewatch || — || align=right data-sort-value="0.74" | 740 m || 
|-id=269 bgcolor=#d6d6d6
| 424269 ||  || — || October 25, 1997 || Kitt Peak || Spacewatch || TEL || align=right | 1.8 km || 
|-id=270 bgcolor=#fefefe
| 424270 ||  || — || October 4, 2007 || Kitt Peak || Spacewatch || — || align=right data-sort-value="0.53" | 530 m || 
|-id=271 bgcolor=#FA8072
| 424271 ||  || — || October 3, 2007 || Purple Mountain || PMO NEO || — || align=right | 1.00 km || 
|-id=272 bgcolor=#d6d6d6
| 424272 ||  || — || October 4, 2007 || Kitt Peak || Spacewatch || EOS || align=right | 1.8 km || 
|-id=273 bgcolor=#d6d6d6
| 424273 ||  || — || September 10, 2007 || Kitt Peak || Spacewatch || — || align=right | 2.6 km || 
|-id=274 bgcolor=#fefefe
| 424274 ||  || — || October 15, 2007 || Bisei SG Center || BATTeRS || — || align=right data-sort-value="0.58" | 580 m || 
|-id=275 bgcolor=#d6d6d6
| 424275 ||  || — || September 12, 2007 || Mount Lemmon || Mount Lemmon Survey || — || align=right | 3.0 km || 
|-id=276 bgcolor=#d6d6d6
| 424276 ||  || — || October 8, 2007 || Mount Lemmon || Mount Lemmon Survey || VER || align=right | 3.0 km || 
|-id=277 bgcolor=#d6d6d6
| 424277 ||  || — || September 12, 2007 || Mount Lemmon || Mount Lemmon Survey || VER || align=right | 2.5 km || 
|-id=278 bgcolor=#fefefe
| 424278 ||  || — || October 8, 2007 || Mount Lemmon || Mount Lemmon Survey || — || align=right data-sort-value="0.81" | 810 m || 
|-id=279 bgcolor=#d6d6d6
| 424279 ||  || — || October 8, 2007 || Mount Lemmon || Mount Lemmon Survey || — || align=right | 2.5 km || 
|-id=280 bgcolor=#fefefe
| 424280 ||  || — || October 8, 2007 || Purple Mountain || PMO NEO || — || align=right data-sort-value="0.72" | 720 m || 
|-id=281 bgcolor=#fefefe
| 424281 ||  || — || October 9, 2007 || Lulin Observatory || LUSS || — || align=right data-sort-value="0.64" | 640 m || 
|-id=282 bgcolor=#d6d6d6
| 424282 ||  || — || October 6, 2007 || Kitt Peak || Spacewatch || — || align=right | 3.3 km || 
|-id=283 bgcolor=#d6d6d6
| 424283 ||  || — || October 7, 2007 || Mount Lemmon || Mount Lemmon Survey || THM || align=right | 2.3 km || 
|-id=284 bgcolor=#d6d6d6
| 424284 ||  || — || October 7, 2007 || Mount Lemmon || Mount Lemmon Survey || THM || align=right | 2.4 km || 
|-id=285 bgcolor=#d6d6d6
| 424285 ||  || — || October 7, 2007 || Mount Lemmon || Mount Lemmon Survey || — || align=right | 3.1 km || 
|-id=286 bgcolor=#d6d6d6
| 424286 ||  || — || August 24, 2007 || Kitt Peak || Spacewatch || — || align=right | 2.7 km || 
|-id=287 bgcolor=#fefefe
| 424287 ||  || — || October 14, 2007 || Dauban || Chante-Perdrix Obs. || — || align=right data-sort-value="0.79" | 790 m || 
|-id=288 bgcolor=#d6d6d6
| 424288 ||  || — || September 11, 2007 || Mount Lemmon || Mount Lemmon Survey || EOS || align=right | 2.5 km || 
|-id=289 bgcolor=#fefefe
| 424289 ||  || — || September 10, 2007 || Catalina || CSS || — || align=right data-sort-value="0.81" | 810 m || 
|-id=290 bgcolor=#d6d6d6
| 424290 ||  || — || October 11, 2007 || Dauban || Chante-Perdrix Obs. || EOS || align=right | 2.5 km || 
|-id=291 bgcolor=#fefefe
| 424291 ||  || — || October 12, 2007 || Socorro || LINEAR || — || align=right data-sort-value="0.66" | 660 m || 
|-id=292 bgcolor=#d6d6d6
| 424292 ||  || — || October 12, 2007 || Dauban || Chante-Perdrix Obs. || — || align=right | 5.7 km || 
|-id=293 bgcolor=#fefefe
| 424293 ||  || — || October 7, 2007 || Kitt Peak || Spacewatch || — || align=right data-sort-value="0.71" | 710 m || 
|-id=294 bgcolor=#d6d6d6
| 424294 ||  || — || September 13, 2007 || Mount Lemmon || Mount Lemmon Survey || VER || align=right | 2.5 km || 
|-id=295 bgcolor=#d6d6d6
| 424295 ||  || — || October 8, 2007 || Catalina || CSS || — || align=right | 2.6 km || 
|-id=296 bgcolor=#d6d6d6
| 424296 ||  || — || October 9, 2007 || Mount Lemmon || Mount Lemmon Survey || — || align=right | 3.0 km || 
|-id=297 bgcolor=#d6d6d6
| 424297 ||  || — || October 10, 2007 || Kitt Peak || Spacewatch || — || align=right | 3.7 km || 
|-id=298 bgcolor=#d6d6d6
| 424298 ||  || — || October 11, 2007 || Kitt Peak || Spacewatch || — || align=right | 5.4 km || 
|-id=299 bgcolor=#d6d6d6
| 424299 ||  || — || October 11, 2007 || Kitt Peak || Spacewatch || — || align=right | 2.7 km || 
|-id=300 bgcolor=#d6d6d6
| 424300 ||  || — || October 9, 2007 || Kitt Peak || Spacewatch || THM || align=right | 2.4 km || 
|}

424301–424400 

|-bgcolor=#d6d6d6
| 424301 ||  || — || October 9, 2007 || Kitt Peak || Spacewatch || THM || align=right | 2.0 km || 
|-id=302 bgcolor=#d6d6d6
| 424302 ||  || — || October 9, 2007 || Kitt Peak || Spacewatch || — || align=right | 3.9 km || 
|-id=303 bgcolor=#d6d6d6
| 424303 ||  || — || October 9, 2007 || Mount Lemmon || Mount Lemmon Survey || — || align=right | 2.8 km || 
|-id=304 bgcolor=#d6d6d6
| 424304 ||  || — || October 9, 2007 || Mount Lemmon || Mount Lemmon Survey || EOS || align=right | 2.0 km || 
|-id=305 bgcolor=#d6d6d6
| 424305 ||  || — || October 11, 2007 || Mount Lemmon || Mount Lemmon Survey || — || align=right | 3.5 km || 
|-id=306 bgcolor=#d6d6d6
| 424306 ||  || — || October 10, 2007 || Mount Lemmon || Mount Lemmon Survey || — || align=right | 3.5 km || 
|-id=307 bgcolor=#d6d6d6
| 424307 ||  || — || October 11, 2007 || Mount Lemmon || Mount Lemmon Survey || — || align=right | 3.2 km || 
|-id=308 bgcolor=#d6d6d6
| 424308 ||  || — || October 4, 2007 || Kitt Peak || Spacewatch || — || align=right | 2.7 km || 
|-id=309 bgcolor=#fefefe
| 424309 ||  || — || October 12, 2007 || Kitt Peak || Spacewatch || — || align=right data-sort-value="0.61" | 610 m || 
|-id=310 bgcolor=#d6d6d6
| 424310 ||  || — || September 25, 2007 || Mount Lemmon || Mount Lemmon Survey || — || align=right | 3.2 km || 
|-id=311 bgcolor=#fefefe
| 424311 ||  || — || October 11, 2007 || Kitt Peak || Spacewatch || — || align=right data-sort-value="0.59" | 590 m || 
|-id=312 bgcolor=#d6d6d6
| 424312 ||  || — || October 14, 2007 || Mount Lemmon || Mount Lemmon Survey || — || align=right | 2.8 km || 
|-id=313 bgcolor=#FA8072
| 424313 ||  || — || October 12, 2007 || Anderson Mesa || LONEOS || — || align=right | 1.3 km || 
|-id=314 bgcolor=#d6d6d6
| 424314 ||  || — || October 13, 2007 || Anderson Mesa || LONEOS || — || align=right | 3.4 km || 
|-id=315 bgcolor=#fefefe
| 424315 ||  || — || October 15, 2007 || Kitt Peak || Spacewatch || — || align=right data-sort-value="0.81" | 810 m || 
|-id=316 bgcolor=#d6d6d6
| 424316 ||  || — || October 10, 2007 || Catalina || CSS || — || align=right | 3.4 km || 
|-id=317 bgcolor=#d6d6d6
| 424317 ||  || — || October 10, 2007 || Kitt Peak || Spacewatch || — || align=right | 3.2 km || 
|-id=318 bgcolor=#d6d6d6
| 424318 ||  || — || October 9, 2007 || Kitt Peak || Spacewatch || EMA || align=right | 4.1 km || 
|-id=319 bgcolor=#d6d6d6
| 424319 ||  || — || October 4, 2007 || Mount Lemmon || Mount Lemmon Survey || — || align=right | 4.5 km || 
|-id=320 bgcolor=#d6d6d6
| 424320 ||  || — || October 8, 2007 || Catalina || CSS || — || align=right | 3.5 km || 
|-id=321 bgcolor=#fefefe
| 424321 ||  || — || October 9, 2007 || Kitt Peak || Spacewatch || — || align=right data-sort-value="0.68" | 680 m || 
|-id=322 bgcolor=#d6d6d6
| 424322 ||  || — || October 16, 2007 || Catalina || CSS || — || align=right | 3.3 km || 
|-id=323 bgcolor=#d6d6d6
| 424323 ||  || — || October 18, 2007 || Mount Lemmon || Mount Lemmon Survey || — || align=right | 3.1 km || 
|-id=324 bgcolor=#E9E9E9
| 424324 ||  || — || October 18, 2007 || Mount Lemmon || Mount Lemmon Survey || — || align=right | 2.6 km || 
|-id=325 bgcolor=#d6d6d6
| 424325 ||  || — || October 16, 2007 || Catalina || CSS || — || align=right | 2.7 km || 
|-id=326 bgcolor=#d6d6d6
| 424326 ||  || — || September 18, 2007 || Catalina || CSS || — || align=right | 3.2 km || 
|-id=327 bgcolor=#d6d6d6
| 424327 ||  || — || September 14, 2007 || Mount Lemmon || Mount Lemmon Survey || — || align=right | 3.0 km || 
|-id=328 bgcolor=#d6d6d6
| 424328 ||  || — || October 30, 2007 || Mount Lemmon || Mount Lemmon Survey || — || align=right | 2.9 km || 
|-id=329 bgcolor=#fefefe
| 424329 ||  || — || October 30, 2007 || Mount Lemmon || Mount Lemmon Survey || — || align=right data-sort-value="0.61" | 610 m || 
|-id=330 bgcolor=#d6d6d6
| 424330 ||  || — || April 12, 2005 || Mount Lemmon || Mount Lemmon Survey || — || align=right | 3.4 km || 
|-id=331 bgcolor=#d6d6d6
| 424331 ||  || — || September 13, 2007 || Mount Lemmon || Mount Lemmon Survey || — || align=right | 2.7 km || 
|-id=332 bgcolor=#d6d6d6
| 424332 ||  || — || September 12, 2007 || Mount Lemmon || Mount Lemmon Survey || — || align=right | 2.5 km || 
|-id=333 bgcolor=#fefefe
| 424333 ||  || — || October 30, 2007 || Kitt Peak || Spacewatch || — || align=right data-sort-value="0.75" | 750 m || 
|-id=334 bgcolor=#d6d6d6
| 424334 ||  || — || October 30, 2007 || Kitt Peak || Spacewatch || — || align=right | 3.7 km || 
|-id=335 bgcolor=#d6d6d6
| 424335 ||  || — || October 30, 2007 || Kitt Peak || Spacewatch || EOS || align=right | 1.9 km || 
|-id=336 bgcolor=#fefefe
| 424336 ||  || — || October 30, 2007 || Kitt Peak || Spacewatch || — || align=right data-sort-value="0.72" | 720 m || 
|-id=337 bgcolor=#fefefe
| 424337 ||  || — || October 24, 2007 || Mount Lemmon || Mount Lemmon Survey || (2076) || align=right data-sort-value="0.82" | 820 m || 
|-id=338 bgcolor=#fefefe
| 424338 ||  || — || October 31, 2007 || Kitt Peak || Spacewatch || — || align=right data-sort-value="0.67" | 670 m || 
|-id=339 bgcolor=#fefefe
| 424339 ||  || — || October 30, 2007 || Mount Lemmon || Mount Lemmon Survey || — || align=right data-sort-value="0.54" | 540 m || 
|-id=340 bgcolor=#fefefe
| 424340 ||  || — || October 30, 2007 || Mount Lemmon || Mount Lemmon Survey || — || align=right data-sort-value="0.56" | 560 m || 
|-id=341 bgcolor=#d6d6d6
| 424341 ||  || — || October 20, 2007 || Mount Lemmon || Mount Lemmon Survey || EOS || align=right | 2.1 km || 
|-id=342 bgcolor=#fefefe
| 424342 ||  || — || October 20, 2007 || Kitt Peak || Spacewatch || — || align=right data-sort-value="0.52" | 520 m || 
|-id=343 bgcolor=#d6d6d6
| 424343 ||  || — || October 19, 2007 || Catalina || CSS || — || align=right | 3.1 km || 
|-id=344 bgcolor=#d6d6d6
| 424344 ||  || — || November 2, 2007 || Mount Lemmon || Mount Lemmon Survey || — || align=right | 3.0 km || 
|-id=345 bgcolor=#fefefe
| 424345 ||  || — || November 1, 2007 || Kitt Peak || Spacewatch || — || align=right data-sort-value="0.95" | 950 m || 
|-id=346 bgcolor=#fefefe
| 424346 ||  || — || November 20, 2004 || Kitt Peak || Spacewatch || — || align=right data-sort-value="0.79" | 790 m || 
|-id=347 bgcolor=#d6d6d6
| 424347 ||  || — || November 1, 2007 || Kitt Peak || Spacewatch || — || align=right | 3.0 km || 
|-id=348 bgcolor=#fefefe
| 424348 ||  || — || October 20, 2007 || Mount Lemmon || Mount Lemmon Survey || — || align=right data-sort-value="0.62" | 620 m || 
|-id=349 bgcolor=#fefefe
| 424349 ||  || — || November 1, 2007 || Kitt Peak || Spacewatch || — || align=right data-sort-value="0.76" | 760 m || 
|-id=350 bgcolor=#d6d6d6
| 424350 ||  || — || November 3, 2007 || Kitt Peak || Spacewatch || — || align=right | 4.8 km || 
|-id=351 bgcolor=#d6d6d6
| 424351 ||  || — || November 3, 2007 || Kitt Peak || Spacewatch || — || align=right | 4.1 km || 
|-id=352 bgcolor=#d6d6d6
| 424352 ||  || — || September 14, 2007 || Mount Lemmon || Mount Lemmon Survey || — || align=right | 3.2 km || 
|-id=353 bgcolor=#d6d6d6
| 424353 ||  || — || November 1, 2007 || Mount Lemmon || Mount Lemmon Survey || VER || align=right | 3.1 km || 
|-id=354 bgcolor=#d6d6d6
| 424354 ||  || — || November 1, 2007 || Mount Lemmon || Mount Lemmon Survey || — || align=right | 2.8 km || 
|-id=355 bgcolor=#FA8072
| 424355 ||  || — || November 4, 2007 || Kitt Peak || Spacewatch || — || align=right data-sort-value="0.74" | 740 m || 
|-id=356 bgcolor=#d6d6d6
| 424356 ||  || — || November 4, 2007 || Kitt Peak || Spacewatch || — || align=right | 3.3 km || 
|-id=357 bgcolor=#d6d6d6
| 424357 ||  || — || November 7, 2007 || Kitt Peak || Spacewatch || — || align=right | 3.1 km || 
|-id=358 bgcolor=#fefefe
| 424358 ||  || — || November 5, 2007 || Kitt Peak || Spacewatch || — || align=right data-sort-value="0.82" | 820 m || 
|-id=359 bgcolor=#d6d6d6
| 424359 ||  || — || November 5, 2007 || Kitt Peak || Spacewatch || THM || align=right | 2.3 km || 
|-id=360 bgcolor=#fefefe
| 424360 ||  || — || October 12, 2007 || Kitt Peak || Spacewatch || — || align=right data-sort-value="0.59" | 590 m || 
|-id=361 bgcolor=#d6d6d6
| 424361 ||  || — || November 7, 2007 || Catalina || CSS || — || align=right | 2.8 km || 
|-id=362 bgcolor=#d6d6d6
| 424362 ||  || — || November 9, 2007 || Mount Lemmon || Mount Lemmon Survey || VER || align=right | 2.9 km || 
|-id=363 bgcolor=#fefefe
| 424363 ||  || — || November 13, 2007 || Bisei SG Center || BATTeRS || — || align=right data-sort-value="0.69" | 690 m || 
|-id=364 bgcolor=#fefefe
| 424364 ||  || — || November 8, 2007 || Mount Lemmon || Mount Lemmon Survey || — || align=right data-sort-value="0.67" | 670 m || 
|-id=365 bgcolor=#fefefe
| 424365 ||  || — || November 9, 2007 || Kitt Peak || Spacewatch || — || align=right data-sort-value="0.75" | 750 m || 
|-id=366 bgcolor=#d6d6d6
| 424366 ||  || — || November 7, 2007 || Kitt Peak || Spacewatch || HYG || align=right | 2.9 km || 
|-id=367 bgcolor=#d6d6d6
| 424367 ||  || — || October 9, 2007 || Kitt Peak || Spacewatch || — || align=right | 3.1 km || 
|-id=368 bgcolor=#fefefe
| 424368 ||  || — || November 2, 2007 || Kitt Peak || Spacewatch || — || align=right data-sort-value="0.91" | 910 m || 
|-id=369 bgcolor=#fefefe
| 424369 ||  || — || November 8, 2007 || Mount Lemmon || Mount Lemmon Survey || — || align=right data-sort-value="0.62" | 620 m || 
|-id=370 bgcolor=#d6d6d6
| 424370 ||  || — || November 13, 2007 || Mount Lemmon || Mount Lemmon Survey || VER || align=right | 2.4 km || 
|-id=371 bgcolor=#d6d6d6
| 424371 ||  || — || November 15, 2007 || Anderson Mesa || LONEOS || — || align=right | 3.1 km || 
|-id=372 bgcolor=#fefefe
| 424372 ||  || — || November 12, 2007 || Socorro || LINEAR || — || align=right data-sort-value="0.86" | 860 m || 
|-id=373 bgcolor=#fefefe
| 424373 ||  || — || November 14, 2007 || Kitt Peak || Spacewatch || — || align=right data-sort-value="0.63" | 630 m || 
|-id=374 bgcolor=#fefefe
| 424374 ||  || — || November 5, 2007 || Mount Lemmon || Mount Lemmon Survey || — || align=right | 1.2 km || 
|-id=375 bgcolor=#d6d6d6
| 424375 ||  || — || November 1, 2007 || Kitt Peak || Spacewatch || — || align=right | 4.1 km || 
|-id=376 bgcolor=#fefefe
| 424376 ||  || — || November 4, 2007 || Kitt Peak || Spacewatch || — || align=right data-sort-value="0.86" | 860 m || 
|-id=377 bgcolor=#FA8072
| 424377 ||  || — || November 18, 2007 || Socorro || LINEAR || — || align=right data-sort-value="0.96" | 960 m || 
|-id=378 bgcolor=#fefefe
| 424378 ||  || — || November 18, 2007 || Socorro || LINEAR || — || align=right data-sort-value="0.80" | 800 m || 
|-id=379 bgcolor=#fefefe
| 424379 ||  || — || November 17, 2007 || Catalina || CSS || — || align=right data-sort-value="0.69" | 690 m || 
|-id=380 bgcolor=#fefefe
| 424380 ||  || — || September 15, 2007 || Mount Lemmon || Mount Lemmon Survey || — || align=right data-sort-value="0.72" | 720 m || 
|-id=381 bgcolor=#fefefe
| 424381 ||  || — || March 7, 1995 || Kitt Peak || Spacewatch || — || align=right data-sort-value="0.80" | 800 m || 
|-id=382 bgcolor=#d6d6d6
| 424382 ||  || — || November 19, 2007 || Mount Lemmon || Mount Lemmon Survey || VER || align=right | 4.0 km || 
|-id=383 bgcolor=#fefefe
| 424383 ||  || — || November 7, 2007 || Catalina || CSS || (2076) || align=right data-sort-value="0.74" | 740 m || 
|-id=384 bgcolor=#d6d6d6
| 424384 ||  || — || November 20, 2007 || Mount Lemmon || Mount Lemmon Survey || VER || align=right | 2.6 km || 
|-id=385 bgcolor=#fefefe
| 424385 ||  || — || November 5, 2007 || Kitt Peak || Spacewatch || — || align=right data-sort-value="0.71" | 710 m || 
|-id=386 bgcolor=#fefefe
| 424386 ||  || — || December 18, 2004 || Mount Lemmon || Mount Lemmon Survey || V || align=right data-sort-value="0.65" | 650 m || 
|-id=387 bgcolor=#fefefe
| 424387 ||  || — || December 4, 2007 || Catalina || CSS || — || align=right data-sort-value="0.71" | 710 m || 
|-id=388 bgcolor=#fefefe
| 424388 ||  || — || December 8, 2007 || La Sagra || OAM Obs. || — || align=right data-sort-value="0.91" | 910 m || 
|-id=389 bgcolor=#fefefe
| 424389 ||  || — || December 12, 2007 || Socorro || LINEAR || — || align=right data-sort-value="0.85" | 850 m || 
|-id=390 bgcolor=#fefefe
| 424390 ||  || — || December 5, 2007 || Kitt Peak || Spacewatch || — || align=right data-sort-value="0.81" | 810 m || 
|-id=391 bgcolor=#fefefe
| 424391 ||  || — || December 14, 2007 || Mount Lemmon || Mount Lemmon Survey || — || align=right data-sort-value="0.67" | 670 m || 
|-id=392 bgcolor=#FFC2E0
| 424392 ||  || — || December 16, 2007 || Mount Lemmon || Mount Lemmon Survey || APO || align=right data-sort-value="0.15" | 150 m || 
|-id=393 bgcolor=#fefefe
| 424393 ||  || — || November 7, 2007 || Mount Lemmon || Mount Lemmon Survey || — || align=right data-sort-value="0.88" | 880 m || 
|-id=394 bgcolor=#fefefe
| 424394 ||  || — || December 5, 2007 || Kitt Peak || Spacewatch || — || align=right data-sort-value="0.77" | 770 m || 
|-id=395 bgcolor=#d6d6d6
| 424395 ||  || — || December 30, 2007 || Mount Lemmon || Mount Lemmon Survey || 7:4 || align=right | 3.1 km || 
|-id=396 bgcolor=#fefefe
| 424396 ||  || — || December 19, 2007 || Mount Lemmon || Mount Lemmon Survey || (2076) || align=right data-sort-value="0.58" | 580 m || 
|-id=397 bgcolor=#fefefe
| 424397 ||  || — || December 16, 2007 || Mount Lemmon || Mount Lemmon Survey || (2076) || align=right data-sort-value="0.62" | 620 m || 
|-id=398 bgcolor=#fefefe
| 424398 ||  || — || December 18, 2007 || Kitt Peak || Spacewatch || — || align=right data-sort-value="0.56" | 560 m || 
|-id=399 bgcolor=#fefefe
| 424399 ||  || — || December 18, 2007 || Kitt Peak || Spacewatch || — || align=right data-sort-value="0.80" | 800 m || 
|-id=400 bgcolor=#fefefe
| 424400 ||  || — || December 18, 2007 || Mount Lemmon || Mount Lemmon Survey || — || align=right data-sort-value="0.88" | 880 m || 
|}

424401–424500 

|-bgcolor=#fefefe
| 424401 ||  || — || December 15, 2007 || Mount Lemmon || Mount Lemmon Survey || — || align=right data-sort-value="0.73" | 730 m || 
|-id=402 bgcolor=#fefefe
| 424402 ||  || — || January 10, 2008 || Mount Lemmon || Mount Lemmon Survey || — || align=right data-sort-value="0.91" | 910 m || 
|-id=403 bgcolor=#fefefe
| 424403 ||  || — || January 10, 2008 || Mount Lemmon || Mount Lemmon Survey || NYS || align=right data-sort-value="0.51" | 510 m || 
|-id=404 bgcolor=#fefefe
| 424404 ||  || — || January 10, 2008 || Mount Lemmon || Mount Lemmon Survey || — || align=right data-sort-value="0.67" | 670 m || 
|-id=405 bgcolor=#fefefe
| 424405 ||  || — || January 10, 2008 || Mount Lemmon || Mount Lemmon Survey || V || align=right data-sort-value="0.76" | 760 m || 
|-id=406 bgcolor=#fefefe
| 424406 ||  || — || January 10, 2008 || Kitt Peak || Spacewatch || — || align=right data-sort-value="0.76" | 760 m || 
|-id=407 bgcolor=#fefefe
| 424407 ||  || — || January 10, 2008 || Mount Lemmon || Mount Lemmon Survey || — || align=right | 1.1 km || 
|-id=408 bgcolor=#fefefe
| 424408 ||  || — || January 10, 2008 || Kitt Peak || Spacewatch || — || align=right data-sort-value="0.69" | 690 m || 
|-id=409 bgcolor=#fefefe
| 424409 ||  || — || January 10, 2008 || Kitt Peak || Spacewatch || — || align=right data-sort-value="0.67" | 670 m || 
|-id=410 bgcolor=#fefefe
| 424410 ||  || — || January 10, 2008 || Mount Lemmon || Mount Lemmon Survey || — || align=right data-sort-value="0.85" | 850 m || 
|-id=411 bgcolor=#fefefe
| 424411 ||  || — || January 10, 2008 || Catalina || CSS || — || align=right | 1.1 km || 
|-id=412 bgcolor=#fefefe
| 424412 ||  || — || December 30, 2007 || Mount Lemmon || Mount Lemmon Survey || — || align=right data-sort-value="0.74" | 740 m || 
|-id=413 bgcolor=#d6d6d6
| 424413 ||  || — || January 11, 2008 || Kitt Peak || Spacewatch || — || align=right | 3.2 km || 
|-id=414 bgcolor=#fefefe
| 424414 ||  || — || January 11, 2008 || Kitt Peak || Spacewatch || (2076) || align=right data-sort-value="0.68" | 680 m || 
|-id=415 bgcolor=#fefefe
| 424415 ||  || — || January 12, 2008 || Kitt Peak || Spacewatch || — || align=right data-sort-value="0.83" | 830 m || 
|-id=416 bgcolor=#fefefe
| 424416 ||  || — || January 12, 2008 || Kitt Peak || Spacewatch || V || align=right data-sort-value="0.61" | 610 m || 
|-id=417 bgcolor=#fefefe
| 424417 ||  || — || January 13, 2008 || Kitt Peak || Spacewatch || — || align=right data-sort-value="0.57" | 570 m || 
|-id=418 bgcolor=#d6d6d6
| 424418 ||  || — || January 11, 2008 || Jornada || D. S. Dixon || SYL7:4 || align=right | 5.2 km || 
|-id=419 bgcolor=#fefefe
| 424419 ||  || — || December 30, 2007 || Kitt Peak || Spacewatch || — || align=right data-sort-value="0.70" | 700 m || 
|-id=420 bgcolor=#fefefe
| 424420 ||  || — || January 1, 2008 || Kitt Peak || Spacewatch || — || align=right data-sort-value="0.75" | 750 m || 
|-id=421 bgcolor=#fefefe
| 424421 ||  || — || January 14, 2008 || Kitt Peak || Spacewatch || — || align=right data-sort-value="0.71" | 710 m || 
|-id=422 bgcolor=#fefefe
| 424422 ||  || — || December 30, 2007 || Kitt Peak || Spacewatch || — || align=right data-sort-value="0.77" | 770 m || 
|-id=423 bgcolor=#fefefe
| 424423 ||  || — || January 10, 2008 || Mount Lemmon || Mount Lemmon Survey || — || align=right data-sort-value="0.68" | 680 m || 
|-id=424 bgcolor=#fefefe
| 424424 ||  || — || January 11, 2008 || Mount Lemmon || Mount Lemmon Survey || — || align=right data-sort-value="0.67" | 670 m || 
|-id=425 bgcolor=#fefefe
| 424425 ||  || — || January 30, 2008 || Kitt Peak || Spacewatch || — || align=right data-sort-value="0.62" | 620 m || 
|-id=426 bgcolor=#fefefe
| 424426 ||  || — || January 30, 2008 || Kitt Peak || Spacewatch || — || align=right | 1.00 km || 
|-id=427 bgcolor=#fefefe
| 424427 ||  || — || January 30, 2008 || Catalina || CSS || — || align=right data-sort-value="0.76" | 760 m || 
|-id=428 bgcolor=#fefefe
| 424428 ||  || — || January 30, 2008 || Kitt Peak || Spacewatch || — || align=right data-sort-value="0.84" | 840 m || 
|-id=429 bgcolor=#fefefe
| 424429 ||  || — || January 31, 2008 || Mount Lemmon || Mount Lemmon Survey || — || align=right data-sort-value="0.77" | 770 m || 
|-id=430 bgcolor=#fefefe
| 424430 ||  || — || January 30, 2008 || Mount Lemmon || Mount Lemmon Survey || — || align=right data-sort-value="0.63" | 630 m || 
|-id=431 bgcolor=#fefefe
| 424431 ||  || — || January 30, 2008 || Kitt Peak || Spacewatch || MAS || align=right data-sort-value="0.66" | 660 m || 
|-id=432 bgcolor=#fefefe
| 424432 ||  || — || January 20, 2008 || Mount Lemmon || Mount Lemmon Survey || — || align=right data-sort-value="0.93" | 930 m || 
|-id=433 bgcolor=#fefefe
| 424433 ||  || — || February 6, 2008 || Socorro || LINEAR || — || align=right | 1.1 km || 
|-id=434 bgcolor=#fefefe
| 424434 ||  || — || February 1, 2008 || Kitt Peak || Spacewatch || — || align=right data-sort-value="0.74" | 740 m || 
|-id=435 bgcolor=#fefefe
| 424435 ||  || — || February 3, 2008 || Kitt Peak || Spacewatch || — || align=right data-sort-value="0.65" | 650 m || 
|-id=436 bgcolor=#fefefe
| 424436 ||  || — || February 3, 2008 || Kitt Peak || Spacewatch || — || align=right data-sort-value="0.62" | 620 m || 
|-id=437 bgcolor=#fefefe
| 424437 ||  || — || February 3, 2008 || Kitt Peak || Spacewatch || — || align=right data-sort-value="0.85" | 850 m || 
|-id=438 bgcolor=#fefefe
| 424438 ||  || — || February 3, 2008 || Kitt Peak || Spacewatch || — || align=right | 1.1 km || 
|-id=439 bgcolor=#fefefe
| 424439 ||  || — || January 12, 2008 || Kitt Peak || Spacewatch || — || align=right data-sort-value="0.70" | 700 m || 
|-id=440 bgcolor=#fefefe
| 424440 ||  || — || February 1, 2008 || Kitt Peak || Spacewatch || — || align=right data-sort-value="0.93" | 930 m || 
|-id=441 bgcolor=#fefefe
| 424441 ||  || — || December 31, 2007 || Mount Lemmon || Mount Lemmon Survey || — || align=right data-sort-value="0.78" | 780 m || 
|-id=442 bgcolor=#fefefe
| 424442 ||  || — || February 2, 2008 || Kitt Peak || Spacewatch || — || align=right data-sort-value="0.78" | 780 m || 
|-id=443 bgcolor=#fefefe
| 424443 ||  || — || September 3, 1999 || Kitt Peak || Spacewatch || — || align=right data-sort-value="0.77" | 770 m || 
|-id=444 bgcolor=#fefefe
| 424444 ||  || — || February 2, 2008 || Mount Lemmon || Mount Lemmon Survey || MAS || align=right data-sort-value="0.65" | 650 m || 
|-id=445 bgcolor=#fefefe
| 424445 ||  || — || February 2, 2008 || Kitt Peak || Spacewatch || — || align=right data-sort-value="0.76" | 760 m || 
|-id=446 bgcolor=#fefefe
| 424446 ||  || — || February 2, 2008 || Kitt Peak || Spacewatch || — || align=right data-sort-value="0.89" | 890 m || 
|-id=447 bgcolor=#fefefe
| 424447 ||  || — || February 7, 2008 || Kitt Peak || Spacewatch || — || align=right data-sort-value="0.82" | 820 m || 
|-id=448 bgcolor=#fefefe
| 424448 ||  || — || February 8, 2008 || Kitt Peak || Spacewatch || — || align=right | 1.0 km || 
|-id=449 bgcolor=#fefefe
| 424449 ||  || — || February 8, 2008 || Mount Lemmon || Mount Lemmon Survey || — || align=right data-sort-value="0.77" | 770 m || 
|-id=450 bgcolor=#fefefe
| 424450 ||  || — || January 30, 2008 || Catalina || CSS || BAP || align=right data-sort-value="0.87" | 870 m || 
|-id=451 bgcolor=#fefefe
| 424451 ||  || — || February 6, 2008 || Catalina || CSS || — || align=right data-sort-value="0.84" | 840 m || 
|-id=452 bgcolor=#fefefe
| 424452 ||  || — || February 7, 2008 || Kitt Peak || Spacewatch || — || align=right data-sort-value="0.73" | 730 m || 
|-id=453 bgcolor=#fefefe
| 424453 ||  || — || February 7, 2008 || Kitt Peak || Spacewatch || NYS || align=right data-sort-value="0.63" | 630 m || 
|-id=454 bgcolor=#fefefe
| 424454 ||  || — || February 7, 2008 || Mount Lemmon || Mount Lemmon Survey || — || align=right data-sort-value="0.82" | 820 m || 
|-id=455 bgcolor=#fefefe
| 424455 ||  || — || February 7, 2008 || Mount Lemmon || Mount Lemmon Survey || — || align=right data-sort-value="0.97" | 970 m || 
|-id=456 bgcolor=#fefefe
| 424456 ||  || — || February 8, 2008 || Kitt Peak || Spacewatch || — || align=right data-sort-value="0.90" | 900 m || 
|-id=457 bgcolor=#fefefe
| 424457 ||  || — || February 8, 2008 || Kitt Peak || Spacewatch || — || align=right data-sort-value="0.71" | 710 m || 
|-id=458 bgcolor=#fefefe
| 424458 ||  || — || January 30, 2008 || Mount Lemmon || Mount Lemmon Survey || MAS || align=right data-sort-value="0.62" | 620 m || 
|-id=459 bgcolor=#fefefe
| 424459 ||  || — || February 9, 2008 || Kitt Peak || Spacewatch || — || align=right data-sort-value="0.78" | 780 m || 
|-id=460 bgcolor=#FA8072
| 424460 ||  || — || February 6, 2008 || Catalina || CSS || — || align=right data-sort-value="0.68" | 680 m || 
|-id=461 bgcolor=#fefefe
| 424461 ||  || — || February 8, 2008 || Kitt Peak || Spacewatch || — || align=right data-sort-value="0.83" | 830 m || 
|-id=462 bgcolor=#fefefe
| 424462 ||  || — || December 31, 2007 || Mount Lemmon || Mount Lemmon Survey || MAS || align=right data-sort-value="0.63" | 630 m || 
|-id=463 bgcolor=#fefefe
| 424463 ||  || — || February 8, 2008 || Kitt Peak || Spacewatch || — || align=right data-sort-value="0.70" | 700 m || 
|-id=464 bgcolor=#fefefe
| 424464 ||  || — || February 8, 2008 || Kitt Peak || Spacewatch || — || align=right data-sort-value="0.71" | 710 m || 
|-id=465 bgcolor=#E9E9E9
| 424465 ||  || — || February 8, 2008 || Kitt Peak || Spacewatch || — || align=right | 1.3 km || 
|-id=466 bgcolor=#fefefe
| 424466 ||  || — || February 8, 2008 || Catalina || CSS || — || align=right data-sort-value="0.79" | 790 m || 
|-id=467 bgcolor=#fefefe
| 424467 ||  || — || January 10, 2008 || Mount Lemmon || Mount Lemmon Survey || — || align=right data-sort-value="0.63" | 630 m || 
|-id=468 bgcolor=#fefefe
| 424468 ||  || — || February 9, 2008 || Kitt Peak || Spacewatch || — || align=right data-sort-value="0.89" | 890 m || 
|-id=469 bgcolor=#fefefe
| 424469 ||  || — || February 9, 2008 || Kitt Peak || Spacewatch || — || align=right data-sort-value="0.68" | 680 m || 
|-id=470 bgcolor=#fefefe
| 424470 ||  || — || February 11, 2008 || Mount Lemmon || Mount Lemmon Survey || — || align=right data-sort-value="0.83" | 830 m || 
|-id=471 bgcolor=#fefefe
| 424471 ||  || — || December 18, 2007 || Mount Lemmon || Mount Lemmon Survey || — || align=right data-sort-value="0.70" | 700 m || 
|-id=472 bgcolor=#fefefe
| 424472 ||  || — || November 19, 2007 || Mount Lemmon || Mount Lemmon Survey || — || align=right data-sort-value="0.78" | 780 m || 
|-id=473 bgcolor=#fefefe
| 424473 ||  || — || February 2, 2008 || Kitt Peak || Spacewatch || — || align=right data-sort-value="0.73" | 730 m || 
|-id=474 bgcolor=#fefefe
| 424474 ||  || — || February 9, 2008 || Kitt Peak || Spacewatch || — || align=right | 1.7 km || 
|-id=475 bgcolor=#fefefe
| 424475 ||  || — || February 12, 2008 || Kitt Peak || Spacewatch || — || align=right data-sort-value="0.78" | 780 m || 
|-id=476 bgcolor=#fefefe
| 424476 ||  || — || February 12, 2008 || Kitt Peak || Spacewatch || — || align=right data-sort-value="0.67" | 670 m || 
|-id=477 bgcolor=#fefefe
| 424477 ||  || — || February 2, 2008 || Kitt Peak || Spacewatch || — || align=right data-sort-value="0.63" | 630 m || 
|-id=478 bgcolor=#fefefe
| 424478 ||  || — || February 2, 2008 || Kitt Peak || Spacewatch || NYS || align=right data-sort-value="0.54" | 540 m || 
|-id=479 bgcolor=#fefefe
| 424479 ||  || — || February 2, 2008 || Kitt Peak || Spacewatch || NYS || align=right data-sort-value="0.53" | 530 m || 
|-id=480 bgcolor=#fefefe
| 424480 ||  || — || February 10, 2008 || Mount Lemmon || Mount Lemmon Survey || — || align=right | 1.0 km || 
|-id=481 bgcolor=#fefefe
| 424481 ||  || — || February 24, 2008 || Mount Lemmon || Mount Lemmon Survey || — || align=right data-sort-value="0.76" | 760 m || 
|-id=482 bgcolor=#FFC2E0
| 424482 ||  || — || February 28, 2008 || Catalina || CSS || APOPHA || align=right data-sort-value="0.42" | 420 m || 
|-id=483 bgcolor=#fefefe
| 424483 ||  || — || February 24, 2008 || Mount Lemmon || Mount Lemmon Survey || — || align=right data-sort-value="0.89" | 890 m || 
|-id=484 bgcolor=#d6d6d6
| 424484 ||  || — || February 26, 2008 || Mount Lemmon || Mount Lemmon Survey || 3:2 || align=right | 5.2 km || 
|-id=485 bgcolor=#fefefe
| 424485 ||  || — || December 31, 2007 || Mount Lemmon || Mount Lemmon Survey || — || align=right data-sort-value="0.83" | 830 m || 
|-id=486 bgcolor=#fefefe
| 424486 ||  || — || February 27, 2008 || Kitt Peak || Spacewatch || NYS || align=right data-sort-value="0.65" | 650 m || 
|-id=487 bgcolor=#fefefe
| 424487 ||  || — || February 27, 2008 || Kitt Peak || Spacewatch || — || align=right | 1.2 km || 
|-id=488 bgcolor=#fefefe
| 424488 ||  || — || February 28, 2008 || Mount Lemmon || Mount Lemmon Survey || — || align=right data-sort-value="0.61" | 610 m || 
|-id=489 bgcolor=#fefefe
| 424489 ||  || — || February 24, 2008 || Altschwendt || W. Ries || — || align=right data-sort-value="0.72" | 720 m || 
|-id=490 bgcolor=#fefefe
| 424490 ||  || — || February 27, 2008 || Kitt Peak || Spacewatch || MAS || align=right data-sort-value="0.70" | 700 m || 
|-id=491 bgcolor=#fefefe
| 424491 ||  || — || February 27, 2008 || Mount Lemmon || Mount Lemmon Survey || — || align=right data-sort-value="0.87" | 870 m || 
|-id=492 bgcolor=#fefefe
| 424492 ||  || — || February 27, 2008 || Kitt Peak || Spacewatch || NYS || align=right data-sort-value="0.69" | 690 m || 
|-id=493 bgcolor=#fefefe
| 424493 ||  || — || February 28, 2008 || Kitt Peak || Spacewatch || — || align=right data-sort-value="0.80" | 800 m || 
|-id=494 bgcolor=#fefefe
| 424494 ||  || — || February 28, 2008 || Mount Lemmon || Mount Lemmon Survey || (2076) || align=right data-sort-value="0.82" | 820 m || 
|-id=495 bgcolor=#fefefe
| 424495 ||  || — || February 28, 2008 || Kitt Peak || Spacewatch || ERI || align=right | 1.9 km || 
|-id=496 bgcolor=#fefefe
| 424496 ||  || — || February 28, 2008 || Kitt Peak || Spacewatch || — || align=right data-sort-value="0.92" | 920 m || 
|-id=497 bgcolor=#fefefe
| 424497 ||  || — || February 28, 2008 || Mount Lemmon || Mount Lemmon Survey || — || align=right data-sort-value="0.85" | 850 m || 
|-id=498 bgcolor=#fefefe
| 424498 ||  || — || February 29, 2008 || Mount Lemmon || Mount Lemmon Survey || — || align=right data-sort-value="0.98" | 980 m || 
|-id=499 bgcolor=#fefefe
| 424499 ||  || — || February 29, 2008 || Kitt Peak || Spacewatch || — || align=right data-sort-value="0.82" | 820 m || 
|-id=500 bgcolor=#fefefe
| 424500 ||  || — || February 29, 2008 || Mount Lemmon || Mount Lemmon Survey || — || align=right data-sort-value="0.81" | 810 m || 
|}

424501–424600 

|-bgcolor=#d6d6d6
| 424501 ||  || — || February 28, 2008 || Mount Lemmon || Mount Lemmon Survey || 3:2 || align=right | 5.1 km || 
|-id=502 bgcolor=#fefefe
| 424502 ||  || — || February 29, 2008 || Kitt Peak || Spacewatch || — || align=right data-sort-value="0.79" | 790 m || 
|-id=503 bgcolor=#fefefe
| 424503 ||  || — || February 24, 2008 || Kitt Peak || Spacewatch || MAS || align=right data-sort-value="0.57" | 570 m || 
|-id=504 bgcolor=#d6d6d6
| 424504 ||  || — || February 8, 2008 || Kitt Peak || Spacewatch || 3:2 || align=right | 4.4 km || 
|-id=505 bgcolor=#fefefe
| 424505 ||  || — || February 28, 2008 || Mount Lemmon || Mount Lemmon Survey || — || align=right data-sort-value="0.65" | 650 m || 
|-id=506 bgcolor=#d6d6d6
| 424506 ||  || — || February 18, 2008 || Mount Lemmon || Mount Lemmon Survey || 3:2 || align=right | 4.0 km || 
|-id=507 bgcolor=#fefefe
| 424507 ||  || — || February 26, 2008 || Mount Lemmon || Mount Lemmon Survey || MASfast? || align=right data-sort-value="0.63" | 630 m || 
|-id=508 bgcolor=#fefefe
| 424508 ||  || — || February 28, 2008 || Kitt Peak || Spacewatch || — || align=right data-sort-value="0.71" | 710 m || 
|-id=509 bgcolor=#fefefe
| 424509 ||  || — || February 13, 2008 || Mount Lemmon || Mount Lemmon Survey || — || align=right | 1.0 km || 
|-id=510 bgcolor=#fefefe
| 424510 ||  || — || March 1, 2008 || Kitt Peak || Spacewatch || — || align=right data-sort-value="0.81" | 810 m || 
|-id=511 bgcolor=#fefefe
| 424511 ||  || — || September 19, 2006 || Kitt Peak || Spacewatch || — || align=right data-sort-value="0.71" | 710 m || 
|-id=512 bgcolor=#fefefe
| 424512 ||  || — || March 2, 2008 || Purple Mountain || PMO NEO || — || align=right data-sort-value="0.71" | 710 m || 
|-id=513 bgcolor=#fefefe
| 424513 ||  || — || December 14, 2003 || Kitt Peak || Spacewatch || — || align=right data-sort-value="0.70" | 700 m || 
|-id=514 bgcolor=#fefefe
| 424514 ||  || — || March 4, 2008 || Catalina || CSS || (5026) || align=right | 1.2 km || 
|-id=515 bgcolor=#E9E9E9
| 424515 ||  || — || March 1, 2008 || Kitt Peak || Spacewatch || — || align=right | 1.1 km || 
|-id=516 bgcolor=#fefefe
| 424516 ||  || — || March 4, 2008 || Kitt Peak || Spacewatch || — || align=right data-sort-value="0.77" | 770 m || 
|-id=517 bgcolor=#fefefe
| 424517 ||  || — || March 5, 2008 || Kitt Peak || Spacewatch || — || align=right data-sort-value="0.78" | 780 m || 
|-id=518 bgcolor=#fefefe
| 424518 ||  || — || March 5, 2008 || Kitt Peak || Spacewatch || MAS || align=right data-sort-value="0.61" | 610 m || 
|-id=519 bgcolor=#fefefe
| 424519 ||  || — || March 5, 2008 || Kitt Peak || Spacewatch || — || align=right data-sort-value="0.77" | 770 m || 
|-id=520 bgcolor=#fefefe
| 424520 ||  || — || March 6, 2008 || Mount Lemmon || Mount Lemmon Survey || — || align=right data-sort-value="0.96" | 960 m || 
|-id=521 bgcolor=#fefefe
| 424521 ||  || — || March 6, 2008 || Mount Lemmon || Mount Lemmon Survey || — || align=right data-sort-value="0.73" | 730 m || 
|-id=522 bgcolor=#E9E9E9
| 424522 ||  || — || March 11, 2008 || Kitt Peak || Spacewatch || — || align=right | 4.5 km || 
|-id=523 bgcolor=#fefefe
| 424523 ||  || — || August 19, 2006 || Kitt Peak || Spacewatch || — || align=right data-sort-value="0.79" | 790 m || 
|-id=524 bgcolor=#fefefe
| 424524 ||  || — || March 6, 2008 || Mount Lemmon || Mount Lemmon Survey || — || align=right data-sort-value="0.89" | 890 m || 
|-id=525 bgcolor=#fefefe
| 424525 ||  || — || March 6, 2008 || Mount Lemmon || Mount Lemmon Survey || — || align=right data-sort-value="0.71" | 710 m || 
|-id=526 bgcolor=#fefefe
| 424526 ||  || — || March 7, 2008 || Kitt Peak || Spacewatch || — || align=right data-sort-value="0.63" | 630 m || 
|-id=527 bgcolor=#fefefe
| 424527 ||  || — || January 30, 2008 || Mount Lemmon || Mount Lemmon Survey || — || align=right data-sort-value="0.79" | 790 m || 
|-id=528 bgcolor=#fefefe
| 424528 ||  || — || February 8, 2008 || Kitt Peak || Spacewatch || — || align=right data-sort-value="0.78" | 780 m || 
|-id=529 bgcolor=#fefefe
| 424529 ||  || — || March 3, 2008 || Catalina || CSS || — || align=right data-sort-value="0.73" | 730 m || 
|-id=530 bgcolor=#fefefe
| 424530 ||  || — || February 13, 2008 || Mount Lemmon || Mount Lemmon Survey || (5026) || align=right data-sort-value="0.73" | 730 m || 
|-id=531 bgcolor=#fefefe
| 424531 ||  || — || March 5, 2008 || Mount Lemmon || Mount Lemmon Survey || — || align=right data-sort-value="0.78" | 780 m || 
|-id=532 bgcolor=#FFC2E0
| 424532 ||  || — || March 15, 2008 || Mount Lemmon || Mount Lemmon Survey || AMO +1km || align=right data-sort-value="0.90" | 900 m || 
|-id=533 bgcolor=#fefefe
| 424533 ||  || — || March 6, 2008 || Catalina || CSS || — || align=right | 1.0 km || 
|-id=534 bgcolor=#fefefe
| 424534 ||  || — || February 2, 2008 || Kitt Peak || Spacewatch || — || align=right data-sort-value="0.82" | 820 m || 
|-id=535 bgcolor=#fefefe
| 424535 ||  || — || March 8, 2008 || Kitt Peak || Spacewatch || NYS || align=right data-sort-value="0.64" | 640 m || 
|-id=536 bgcolor=#fefefe
| 424536 ||  || — || March 8, 2008 || Kitt Peak || Spacewatch || NYS || align=right data-sort-value="0.62" | 620 m || 
|-id=537 bgcolor=#fefefe
| 424537 ||  || — || February 29, 2008 || Kitt Peak || Spacewatch || NYS || align=right data-sort-value="0.59" | 590 m || 
|-id=538 bgcolor=#fefefe
| 424538 ||  || — || March 11, 2008 || Kitt Peak || Spacewatch || — || align=right data-sort-value="0.88" | 880 m || 
|-id=539 bgcolor=#fefefe
| 424539 ||  || — || November 23, 2006 || Mount Lemmon || Mount Lemmon Survey || — || align=right data-sort-value="0.81" | 810 m || 
|-id=540 bgcolor=#fefefe
| 424540 ||  || — || February 11, 2008 || Mount Lemmon || Mount Lemmon Survey || — || align=right data-sort-value="0.67" | 670 m || 
|-id=541 bgcolor=#fefefe
| 424541 ||  || — || March 11, 2008 || Kitt Peak || Spacewatch || — || align=right data-sort-value="0.88" | 880 m || 
|-id=542 bgcolor=#fefefe
| 424542 ||  || — || March 12, 2008 || Kitt Peak || Spacewatch || — || align=right data-sort-value="0.74" | 740 m || 
|-id=543 bgcolor=#fefefe
| 424543 ||  || — || February 9, 2008 || Kitt Peak || Spacewatch || — || align=right data-sort-value="0.67" | 670 m || 
|-id=544 bgcolor=#fefefe
| 424544 ||  || — || March 2, 2008 || Kitt Peak || Spacewatch || NYS || align=right data-sort-value="0.55" | 550 m || 
|-id=545 bgcolor=#fefefe
| 424545 ||  || — || March 2, 2008 || Kitt Peak || Spacewatch || — || align=right data-sort-value="0.73" | 730 m || 
|-id=546 bgcolor=#fefefe
| 424546 ||  || — || October 1, 2006 || Kitt Peak || Spacewatch || — || align=right data-sort-value="0.66" | 660 m || 
|-id=547 bgcolor=#fefefe
| 424547 ||  || — || March 10, 2008 || Kitt Peak || Spacewatch || — || align=right data-sort-value="0.69" | 690 m || 
|-id=548 bgcolor=#fefefe
| 424548 ||  || — || March 13, 2008 || Kitt Peak || Spacewatch || — || align=right data-sort-value="0.87" | 870 m || 
|-id=549 bgcolor=#fefefe
| 424549 ||  || — || March 2, 2008 || Kitt Peak || Spacewatch || MAS || align=right data-sort-value="0.78" | 780 m || 
|-id=550 bgcolor=#d6d6d6
| 424550 ||  || — || March 9, 2008 || Kitt Peak || Spacewatch || 3:2 || align=right | 4.4 km || 
|-id=551 bgcolor=#fefefe
| 424551 ||  || — || March 13, 2008 || Kitt Peak || Spacewatch || — || align=right data-sort-value="0.87" | 870 m || 
|-id=552 bgcolor=#fefefe
| 424552 ||  || — || March 10, 2008 || Kitt Peak || Spacewatch || V || align=right data-sort-value="0.69" | 690 m || 
|-id=553 bgcolor=#fefefe
| 424553 ||  || — || March 25, 2008 || Kitt Peak || Spacewatch || MAS || align=right data-sort-value="0.63" | 630 m || 
|-id=554 bgcolor=#fefefe
| 424554 ||  || — || March 27, 2008 || Kitt Peak || Spacewatch || — || align=right data-sort-value="0.97" | 970 m || 
|-id=555 bgcolor=#fefefe
| 424555 ||  || — || March 27, 2008 || Kitt Peak || Spacewatch || — || align=right | 1.00 km || 
|-id=556 bgcolor=#E9E9E9
| 424556 ||  || — || March 27, 2008 || Kitt Peak || Spacewatch || — || align=right | 1.2 km || 
|-id=557 bgcolor=#fefefe
| 424557 ||  || — || March 28, 2008 || Mount Lemmon || Mount Lemmon Survey || — || align=right data-sort-value="0.70" | 700 m || 
|-id=558 bgcolor=#fefefe
| 424558 ||  || — || March 10, 2008 || Kitt Peak || Spacewatch || NYS || align=right data-sort-value="0.70" | 700 m || 
|-id=559 bgcolor=#fefefe
| 424559 ||  || — || December 17, 2003 || Kitt Peak || Spacewatch || — || align=right data-sort-value="0.67" | 670 m || 
|-id=560 bgcolor=#fefefe
| 424560 ||  || — || March 28, 2008 || Mount Lemmon || Mount Lemmon Survey || — || align=right data-sort-value="0.61" | 610 m || 
|-id=561 bgcolor=#fefefe
| 424561 ||  || — || March 28, 2008 || Mount Lemmon || Mount Lemmon Survey || NYS || align=right data-sort-value="0.59" | 590 m || 
|-id=562 bgcolor=#fefefe
| 424562 ||  || — || February 14, 2004 || Kitt Peak || Spacewatch || — || align=right data-sort-value="0.70" | 700 m || 
|-id=563 bgcolor=#fefefe
| 424563 ||  || — || March 27, 2008 || Kitt Peak || Spacewatch || — || align=right data-sort-value="0.98" | 980 m || 
|-id=564 bgcolor=#fefefe
| 424564 ||  || — || March 28, 2008 || Mount Lemmon || Mount Lemmon Survey || MAS || align=right data-sort-value="0.70" | 700 m || 
|-id=565 bgcolor=#fefefe
| 424565 ||  || — || March 28, 2008 || Mount Lemmon || Mount Lemmon Survey || NYS || align=right data-sort-value="0.74" | 740 m || 
|-id=566 bgcolor=#fefefe
| 424566 ||  || — || February 13, 2008 || Mount Lemmon || Mount Lemmon Survey || NYS || align=right data-sort-value="0.49" | 490 m || 
|-id=567 bgcolor=#fefefe
| 424567 ||  || — || March 29, 2008 || Kitt Peak || Spacewatch || — || align=right data-sort-value="0.80" | 800 m || 
|-id=568 bgcolor=#fefefe
| 424568 ||  || — || March 29, 2008 || Catalina || CSS || — || align=right data-sort-value="0.82" | 820 m || 
|-id=569 bgcolor=#fefefe
| 424569 ||  || — || March 30, 2008 || Kitt Peak || Spacewatch || NYS || align=right data-sort-value="0.60" | 600 m || 
|-id=570 bgcolor=#d6d6d6
| 424570 ||  || — || January 30, 2008 || Mount Lemmon || Mount Lemmon Survey || 3:2 || align=right | 4.4 km || 
|-id=571 bgcolor=#fefefe
| 424571 ||  || — || March 30, 2008 || Catalina || CSS || — || align=right | 1.0 km || 
|-id=572 bgcolor=#fefefe
| 424572 ||  || — || February 28, 2008 || Kitt Peak || Spacewatch || — || align=right data-sort-value="0.91" | 910 m || 
|-id=573 bgcolor=#fefefe
| 424573 ||  || — || April 2, 2008 || Socorro || LINEAR || — || align=right data-sort-value="0.84" | 840 m || 
|-id=574 bgcolor=#fefefe
| 424574 ||  || — || April 5, 2008 || Catalina || CSS || — || align=right | 1.0 km || 
|-id=575 bgcolor=#fefefe
| 424575 ||  || — || March 28, 2008 || Kitt Peak || Spacewatch || — || align=right data-sort-value="0.72" | 720 m || 
|-id=576 bgcolor=#fefefe
| 424576 ||  || — || March 4, 2008 || Mount Lemmon || Mount Lemmon Survey || NYS || align=right data-sort-value="0.66" | 660 m || 
|-id=577 bgcolor=#fefefe
| 424577 ||  || — || March 10, 2008 || Kitt Peak || Spacewatch || — || align=right data-sort-value="0.82" | 820 m || 
|-id=578 bgcolor=#fefefe
| 424578 ||  || — || October 13, 2006 || Kitt Peak || Spacewatch || — || align=right data-sort-value="0.67" | 670 m || 
|-id=579 bgcolor=#fefefe
| 424579 ||  || — || March 15, 2008 || Mount Lemmon || Mount Lemmon Survey || — || align=right data-sort-value="0.80" | 800 m || 
|-id=580 bgcolor=#fefefe
| 424580 ||  || — || April 3, 2008 || Kitt Peak || Spacewatch || — || align=right data-sort-value="0.82" | 820 m || 
|-id=581 bgcolor=#fefefe
| 424581 ||  || — || April 3, 2008 || Kitt Peak || Spacewatch || NYS || align=right data-sort-value="0.54" | 540 m || 
|-id=582 bgcolor=#fefefe
| 424582 ||  || — || April 4, 2008 || Kitt Peak || Spacewatch || — || align=right data-sort-value="0.84" | 840 m || 
|-id=583 bgcolor=#fefefe
| 424583 ||  || — || April 5, 2008 || Kitt Peak || Spacewatch || — || align=right data-sort-value="0.87" | 870 m || 
|-id=584 bgcolor=#fefefe
| 424584 ||  || — || April 5, 2008 || Mount Lemmon || Mount Lemmon Survey || NYS || align=right data-sort-value="0.72" | 720 m || 
|-id=585 bgcolor=#fefefe
| 424585 ||  || — || April 5, 2008 || Mount Lemmon || Mount Lemmon Survey || V || align=right data-sort-value="0.69" | 690 m || 
|-id=586 bgcolor=#fefefe
| 424586 ||  || — || April 6, 2008 || Kitt Peak || Spacewatch || — || align=right data-sort-value="0.80" | 800 m || 
|-id=587 bgcolor=#E9E9E9
| 424587 ||  || — || April 6, 2008 || Kitt Peak || Spacewatch || — || align=right data-sort-value="0.98" | 980 m || 
|-id=588 bgcolor=#E9E9E9
| 424588 ||  || — || April 6, 2008 || Kitt Peak || Spacewatch || — || align=right | 1.4 km || 
|-id=589 bgcolor=#fefefe
| 424589 ||  || — || April 7, 2008 || Kitt Peak || Spacewatch || NYS || align=right data-sort-value="0.75" | 750 m || 
|-id=590 bgcolor=#E9E9E9
| 424590 ||  || — || March 31, 2008 || Kitt Peak || Spacewatch || — || align=right | 1.4 km || 
|-id=591 bgcolor=#fefefe
| 424591 ||  || — || March 13, 2008 || Kitt Peak || Spacewatch || — || align=right data-sort-value="0.85" | 850 m || 
|-id=592 bgcolor=#E9E9E9
| 424592 ||  || — || April 1, 2008 || Kitt Peak || Spacewatch || EUN || align=right data-sort-value="0.97" | 970 m || 
|-id=593 bgcolor=#fefefe
| 424593 ||  || — || April 9, 2008 || Kitt Peak || Spacewatch || V || align=right data-sort-value="0.71" | 710 m || 
|-id=594 bgcolor=#fefefe
| 424594 ||  || — || April 11, 2008 || Mount Lemmon || Mount Lemmon Survey || — || align=right data-sort-value="0.83" | 830 m || 
|-id=595 bgcolor=#fefefe
| 424595 ||  || — || April 11, 2008 || Mount Lemmon || Mount Lemmon Survey || NYS || align=right data-sort-value="0.76" | 760 m || 
|-id=596 bgcolor=#fefefe
| 424596 ||  || — || April 13, 2008 || Kitt Peak || Spacewatch || — || align=right data-sort-value="0.70" | 700 m || 
|-id=597 bgcolor=#E9E9E9
| 424597 ||  || — || April 3, 2008 || Kitt Peak || Spacewatch || — || align=right | 1.4 km || 
|-id=598 bgcolor=#E9E9E9
| 424598 ||  || — || February 12, 2008 || Mount Lemmon || Mount Lemmon Survey || — || align=right | 1.1 km || 
|-id=599 bgcolor=#fefefe
| 424599 ||  || — || April 8, 2008 || Kitt Peak || Spacewatch || — || align=right data-sort-value="0.74" | 740 m || 
|-id=600 bgcolor=#fefefe
| 424600 ||  || — || April 24, 2008 || Kitt Peak || Spacewatch || — || align=right data-sort-value="0.94" | 940 m || 
|}

424601–424700 

|-bgcolor=#fefefe
| 424601 ||  || — || April 25, 2008 || Kitt Peak || Spacewatch || NYS || align=right data-sort-value="0.65" | 650 m || 
|-id=602 bgcolor=#fefefe
| 424602 ||  || — || April 26, 2008 || Mount Lemmon || Mount Lemmon Survey || — || align=right data-sort-value="0.69" | 690 m || 
|-id=603 bgcolor=#fefefe
| 424603 ||  || — || April 28, 2008 || Kitt Peak || Spacewatch || — || align=right data-sort-value="0.67" | 670 m || 
|-id=604 bgcolor=#fefefe
| 424604 ||  || — || April 3, 2008 || Mount Lemmon || Mount Lemmon Survey || NYS || align=right data-sort-value="0.65" | 650 m || 
|-id=605 bgcolor=#fefefe
| 424605 ||  || — || April 26, 2008 || Catalina || CSS || — || align=right | 1.3 km || 
|-id=606 bgcolor=#C2FFFF
| 424606 ||  || — || April 15, 2008 || Kitt Peak || Spacewatch || L5 || align=right | 8.7 km || 
|-id=607 bgcolor=#fefefe
| 424607 ||  || — || April 29, 2008 || Kitt Peak || Spacewatch || — || align=right data-sort-value="0.76" | 760 m || 
|-id=608 bgcolor=#fefefe
| 424608 ||  || — || April 29, 2008 || Kitt Peak || Spacewatch || NYS || align=right data-sort-value="0.70" | 700 m || 
|-id=609 bgcolor=#E9E9E9
| 424609 ||  || — || April 25, 2008 || Kitt Peak || Spacewatch || EUN || align=right | 1.5 km || 
|-id=610 bgcolor=#E9E9E9
| 424610 ||  || — || April 27, 2008 || Mount Lemmon || Mount Lemmon Survey || — || align=right | 1.5 km || 
|-id=611 bgcolor=#E9E9E9
| 424611 ||  || — || March 7, 2008 || Mount Lemmon || Mount Lemmon Survey || — || align=right | 1.9 km || 
|-id=612 bgcolor=#fefefe
| 424612 ||  || — || May 1, 2008 || Kitt Peak || Spacewatch || — || align=right | 1.2 km || 
|-id=613 bgcolor=#E9E9E9
| 424613 ||  || — || May 2, 2008 || Moletai || Molėtai Obs. || — || align=right | 2.6 km || 
|-id=614 bgcolor=#fefefe
| 424614 ||  || — || May 2, 2008 || Kitt Peak || Spacewatch || NYS || align=right data-sort-value="0.66" | 660 m || 
|-id=615 bgcolor=#E9E9E9
| 424615 ||  || — || May 3, 2008 || Kitt Peak || Spacewatch || — || align=right | 1.1 km || 
|-id=616 bgcolor=#E9E9E9
| 424616 ||  || — || April 14, 2008 || Mount Lemmon || Mount Lemmon Survey || — || align=right | 1.3 km || 
|-id=617 bgcolor=#E9E9E9
| 424617 ||  || — || May 2, 2008 || Kitt Peak || Spacewatch || — || align=right data-sort-value="0.94" | 940 m || 
|-id=618 bgcolor=#C2FFFF
| 424618 ||  || — || May 11, 2008 || Farra d'Isonzo || Farra d'Isonzo || L5 || align=right | 14 km || 
|-id=619 bgcolor=#C2FFFF
| 424619 ||  || — || May 8, 2008 || Kitt Peak || Spacewatch || L5 || align=right | 8.7 km || 
|-id=620 bgcolor=#FA8072
| 424620 ||  || — || May 3, 2008 || Catalina || CSS || H || align=right data-sort-value="0.90" | 900 m || 
|-id=621 bgcolor=#C2FFFF
| 424621 ||  || — || May 8, 2008 || Kitt Peak || Spacewatch || L5 || align=right | 7.6 km || 
|-id=622 bgcolor=#fefefe
| 424622 ||  || — || May 5, 2008 || Mount Lemmon || Mount Lemmon Survey || MAS || align=right data-sort-value="0.71" | 710 m || 
|-id=623 bgcolor=#E9E9E9
| 424623 ||  || — || May 5, 2008 || Mount Lemmon || Mount Lemmon Survey || — || align=right | 1.8 km || 
|-id=624 bgcolor=#E9E9E9
| 424624 ||  || — || May 3, 2008 || Mount Lemmon || Mount Lemmon Survey || — || align=right | 1.0 km || 
|-id=625 bgcolor=#fefefe
| 424625 ||  || — || May 6, 2008 || Mount Lemmon || Mount Lemmon Survey || — || align=right data-sort-value="0.82" | 820 m || 
|-id=626 bgcolor=#E9E9E9
| 424626 ||  || — || May 15, 2008 || Mount Lemmon || Mount Lemmon Survey || MAR || align=right data-sort-value="0.93" | 930 m || 
|-id=627 bgcolor=#fefefe
| 424627 ||  || — || May 3, 2008 || Mount Lemmon || Mount Lemmon Survey || — || align=right data-sort-value="0.94" | 940 m || 
|-id=628 bgcolor=#E9E9E9
| 424628 ||  || — || May 27, 2008 || Kitt Peak || Spacewatch || EUN || align=right | 1.2 km || 
|-id=629 bgcolor=#fefefe
| 424629 ||  || — || May 28, 2008 || Kitt Peak || Spacewatch || V || align=right data-sort-value="0.65" | 650 m || 
|-id=630 bgcolor=#fefefe
| 424630 ||  || — || December 21, 2006 || Kitt Peak || Spacewatch || NYS || align=right data-sort-value="0.72" | 720 m || 
|-id=631 bgcolor=#fefefe
| 424631 ||  || — || April 28, 2008 || Mount Lemmon || Mount Lemmon Survey || H || align=right data-sort-value="0.66" | 660 m || 
|-id=632 bgcolor=#C2FFFF
| 424632 ||  || — || May 28, 2008 || Kitt Peak || Spacewatch || L5 || align=right | 12 km || 
|-id=633 bgcolor=#fefefe
| 424633 ||  || — || May 30, 2008 || Kitt Peak || Spacewatch || — || align=right data-sort-value="0.89" | 890 m || 
|-id=634 bgcolor=#fefefe
| 424634 ||  || — || April 27, 2008 || Kitt Peak || Spacewatch || — || align=right data-sort-value="0.70" | 700 m || 
|-id=635 bgcolor=#fefefe
| 424635 ||  || — || May 31, 2008 || Kitt Peak || Spacewatch || — || align=right data-sort-value="0.69" | 690 m || 
|-id=636 bgcolor=#fefefe
| 424636 ||  || — || June 1, 2008 || Kitt Peak || Spacewatch || — || align=right data-sort-value="0.79" | 790 m || 
|-id=637 bgcolor=#fefefe
| 424637 ||  || — || March 6, 2008 || Mount Lemmon || Mount Lemmon Survey || — || align=right data-sort-value="0.80" | 800 m || 
|-id=638 bgcolor=#E9E9E9
| 424638 ||  || — || June 6, 2008 || Kitt Peak || Spacewatch || JUN || align=right | 1.1 km || 
|-id=639 bgcolor=#E9E9E9
| 424639 ||  || — || June 6, 2008 || Kitt Peak || Spacewatch || — || align=right | 2.1 km || 
|-id=640 bgcolor=#E9E9E9
| 424640 ||  || — || June 7, 2008 || Kitt Peak || Spacewatch || EUN || align=right | 1.1 km || 
|-id=641 bgcolor=#fefefe
| 424641 ||  || — || May 29, 2008 || Kitt Peak || Spacewatch || — || align=right data-sort-value="0.83" | 830 m || 
|-id=642 bgcolor=#E9E9E9
| 424642 ||  || — || July 16, 2008 || Charleston || ARO || — || align=right | 1.5 km || 
|-id=643 bgcolor=#E9E9E9
| 424643 ||  || — || June 2, 2008 || Mount Lemmon || Mount Lemmon Survey || — || align=right | 2.4 km || 
|-id=644 bgcolor=#E9E9E9
| 424644 ||  || — || July 29, 2008 || Mount Lemmon || Mount Lemmon Survey || — || align=right | 3.3 km || 
|-id=645 bgcolor=#E9E9E9
| 424645 ||  || — || July 31, 2008 || La Sagra || OAM Obs. || — || align=right | 2.2 km || 
|-id=646 bgcolor=#E9E9E9
| 424646 ||  || — || July 29, 2008 || Kitt Peak || Spacewatch || EUN || align=right | 1.4 km || 
|-id=647 bgcolor=#fefefe
| 424647 ||  || — || August 5, 2008 || La Sagra || OAM Obs. || H || align=right data-sort-value="0.91" | 910 m || 
|-id=648 bgcolor=#E9E9E9
| 424648 ||  || — || August 7, 2008 || Andrushivka || Andrushivka Obs. || — || align=right | 2.0 km || 
|-id=649 bgcolor=#E9E9E9
| 424649 ||  || — || July 11, 2008 || Siding Spring || SSS || — || align=right | 2.5 km || 
|-id=650 bgcolor=#E9E9E9
| 424650 ||  || — || August 21, 2008 || Kitt Peak || Spacewatch || — || align=right | 2.8 km || 
|-id=651 bgcolor=#E9E9E9
| 424651 ||  || — || August 26, 2008 || La Sagra || OAM Obs. || — || align=right | 1.7 km || 
|-id=652 bgcolor=#E9E9E9
| 424652 ||  || — || August 26, 2008 || Socorro || LINEAR || — || align=right | 2.3 km || 
|-id=653 bgcolor=#E9E9E9
| 424653 ||  || — || August 26, 2008 || Socorro || LINEAR || — || align=right | 3.0 km || 
|-id=654 bgcolor=#E9E9E9
| 424654 ||  || — || August 26, 2008 || Socorro || LINEAR || EUN || align=right | 1.5 km || 
|-id=655 bgcolor=#d6d6d6
| 424655 ||  || — || August 31, 2008 || Bergisch Gladbach || W. Bickel || — || align=right | 3.0 km || 
|-id=656 bgcolor=#d6d6d6
| 424656 ||  || — || August 20, 2008 || Kitt Peak || Spacewatch || — || align=right | 1.8 km || 
|-id=657 bgcolor=#E9E9E9
| 424657 ||  || — || August 24, 2008 || Kitt Peak || Spacewatch || — || align=right | 2.4 km || 
|-id=658 bgcolor=#d6d6d6
| 424658 ||  || — || August 21, 2008 || Kitt Peak || Spacewatch || — || align=right | 2.2 km || 
|-id=659 bgcolor=#E9E9E9
| 424659 ||  || — || August 24, 2008 || Kitt Peak || Spacewatch || — || align=right | 1.9 km || 
|-id=660 bgcolor=#E9E9E9
| 424660 ||  || — || February 21, 2006 || Catalina || CSS || — || align=right | 2.2 km || 
|-id=661 bgcolor=#E9E9E9
| 424661 ||  || — || September 4, 2008 || Kitt Peak || Spacewatch || — || align=right | 1.9 km || 
|-id=662 bgcolor=#E9E9E9
| 424662 ||  || — || September 5, 2008 || Junk Bond || D. Healy || — || align=right | 1.9 km || 
|-id=663 bgcolor=#d6d6d6
| 424663 ||  || — || September 2, 2008 || Kitt Peak || Spacewatch || EOS || align=right | 1.3 km || 
|-id=664 bgcolor=#E9E9E9
| 424664 ||  || — || September 2, 2008 || Kitt Peak || Spacewatch || — || align=right | 2.0 km || 
|-id=665 bgcolor=#E9E9E9
| 424665 ||  || — || September 2, 2008 || Kitt Peak || Spacewatch || — || align=right data-sort-value="0.85" | 850 m || 
|-id=666 bgcolor=#d6d6d6
| 424666 ||  || — || September 2, 2008 || Kitt Peak || Spacewatch || KOR || align=right | 1.4 km || 
|-id=667 bgcolor=#E9E9E9
| 424667 ||  || — || April 26, 2007 || Mount Lemmon || Mount Lemmon Survey || — || align=right | 2.1 km || 
|-id=668 bgcolor=#E9E9E9
| 424668 ||  || — || September 3, 2008 || Kitt Peak || Spacewatch || — || align=right | 2.2 km || 
|-id=669 bgcolor=#E9E9E9
| 424669 ||  || — || September 3, 2008 || Kitt Peak || Spacewatch || MRX || align=right data-sort-value="0.97" | 970 m || 
|-id=670 bgcolor=#d6d6d6
| 424670 ||  || — || September 4, 2008 || Kitt Peak || Spacewatch || — || align=right | 2.3 km || 
|-id=671 bgcolor=#E9E9E9
| 424671 ||  || — || September 6, 2008 || Mount Lemmon || Mount Lemmon Survey || — || align=right | 1.9 km || 
|-id=672 bgcolor=#d6d6d6
| 424672 ||  || — || September 3, 2008 || Kitt Peak || Spacewatch || — || align=right | 2.9 km || 
|-id=673 bgcolor=#fefefe
| 424673 ||  || — || September 4, 2008 || Kitt Peak || Spacewatch || — || align=right data-sort-value="0.49" | 490 m || 
|-id=674 bgcolor=#E9E9E9
| 424674 ||  || — || September 4, 2008 || Kitt Peak || Spacewatch || — || align=right | 1.8 km || 
|-id=675 bgcolor=#E9E9E9
| 424675 ||  || — || September 6, 2008 || Kitt Peak || Spacewatch || HOF || align=right | 2.8 km || 
|-id=676 bgcolor=#d6d6d6
| 424676 ||  || — || July 29, 2008 || Kitt Peak || Spacewatch || — || align=right | 2.1 km || 
|-id=677 bgcolor=#d6d6d6
| 424677 ||  || — || September 2, 2008 || Kitt Peak || Spacewatch || KOR || align=right | 1.2 km || 
|-id=678 bgcolor=#d6d6d6
| 424678 ||  || — || September 4, 2008 || Kitt Peak || Spacewatch || — || align=right | 2.5 km || 
|-id=679 bgcolor=#E9E9E9
| 424679 ||  || — || September 5, 2008 || Kitt Peak || Spacewatch || — || align=right | 1.9 km || 
|-id=680 bgcolor=#E9E9E9
| 424680 ||  || — || September 5, 2008 || Kitt Peak || Spacewatch || — || align=right | 2.3 km || 
|-id=681 bgcolor=#E9E9E9
| 424681 ||  || — || September 9, 2008 || Mount Lemmon || Mount Lemmon Survey || — || align=right | 3.1 km || 
|-id=682 bgcolor=#d6d6d6
| 424682 ||  || — || September 10, 2008 || Kitt Peak || Spacewatch || KOR || align=right | 1.1 km || 
|-id=683 bgcolor=#E9E9E9
| 424683 ||  || — || September 4, 2008 || Kitt Peak || Spacewatch || — || align=right | 2.1 km || 
|-id=684 bgcolor=#d6d6d6
| 424684 ||  || — || September 4, 2008 || Kitt Peak || Spacewatch || — || align=right | 2.5 km || 
|-id=685 bgcolor=#d6d6d6
| 424685 ||  || — || September 6, 2008 || Kitt Peak || Spacewatch || KOR || align=right | 1.4 km || 
|-id=686 bgcolor=#d6d6d6
| 424686 ||  || — || September 6, 2008 || Mount Lemmon || Mount Lemmon Survey || — || align=right | 2.6 km || 
|-id=687 bgcolor=#d6d6d6
| 424687 ||  || — || September 9, 2008 || Mount Lemmon || Mount Lemmon Survey || — || align=right | 2.0 km || 
|-id=688 bgcolor=#d6d6d6
| 424688 ||  || — || September 6, 2008 || Kitt Peak || Spacewatch || KOR || align=right | 1.2 km || 
|-id=689 bgcolor=#d6d6d6
| 424689 ||  || — || September 4, 2008 || Kitt Peak || Spacewatch || — || align=right | 2.5 km || 
|-id=690 bgcolor=#E9E9E9
| 424690 ||  || — || September 4, 2008 || Socorro || LINEAR || — || align=right | 2.2 km || 
|-id=691 bgcolor=#E9E9E9
| 424691 ||  || — || September 9, 2008 || Mount Lemmon || Mount Lemmon Survey || — || align=right | 2.7 km || 
|-id=692 bgcolor=#d6d6d6
| 424692 ||  || — || September 4, 2008 || Kitt Peak || Spacewatch || KOR || align=right | 1.3 km || 
|-id=693 bgcolor=#E9E9E9
| 424693 ||  || — || September 7, 2008 || Mount Lemmon || Mount Lemmon Survey || DOR || align=right | 2.8 km || 
|-id=694 bgcolor=#E9E9E9
| 424694 ||  || — || September 6, 2008 || Catalina || CSS ||  || align=right | 2.4 km || 
|-id=695 bgcolor=#E9E9E9
| 424695 ||  || — || August 7, 2008 || Kitt Peak || Spacewatch || — || align=right | 2.0 km || 
|-id=696 bgcolor=#E9E9E9
| 424696 ||  || — || September 19, 2008 || Kitt Peak || Spacewatch || — || align=right | 2.3 km || 
|-id=697 bgcolor=#E9E9E9
| 424697 ||  || — || July 30, 2008 || Kitt Peak || Spacewatch || — || align=right | 1.9 km || 
|-id=698 bgcolor=#d6d6d6
| 424698 ||  || — || September 20, 2008 || Kitt Peak || Spacewatch || — || align=right | 1.9 km || 
|-id=699 bgcolor=#E9E9E9
| 424699 ||  || — || September 6, 2008 || Mount Lemmon || Mount Lemmon Survey || — || align=right | 1.1 km || 
|-id=700 bgcolor=#d6d6d6
| 424700 ||  || — || September 20, 2008 || Kitt Peak || Spacewatch || Tj (2.98) || align=right | 3.1 km || 
|}

424701–424800 

|-bgcolor=#d6d6d6
| 424701 ||  || — || September 20, 2008 || Kitt Peak || Spacewatch || — || align=right | 1.6 km || 
|-id=702 bgcolor=#d6d6d6
| 424702 ||  || — || September 20, 2008 || Kitt Peak || Spacewatch || — || align=right | 2.9 km || 
|-id=703 bgcolor=#E9E9E9
| 424703 ||  || — || September 20, 2008 || Mount Lemmon || Mount Lemmon Survey || — || align=right | 1.1 km || 
|-id=704 bgcolor=#d6d6d6
| 424704 ||  || — || September 20, 2008 || Mount Lemmon || Mount Lemmon Survey || EOS || align=right | 1.3 km || 
|-id=705 bgcolor=#d6d6d6
| 424705 ||  || — || September 21, 2008 || Mount Lemmon || Mount Lemmon Survey || — || align=right | 2.9 km || 
|-id=706 bgcolor=#d6d6d6
| 424706 ||  || — || September 21, 2008 || Kitt Peak || Spacewatch || — || align=right | 2.7 km || 
|-id=707 bgcolor=#d6d6d6
| 424707 ||  || — || September 20, 2008 || Kitt Peak || Spacewatch || — || align=right | 3.1 km || 
|-id=708 bgcolor=#d6d6d6
| 424708 ||  || — || September 21, 2008 || Kitt Peak || Spacewatch || — || align=right | 2.6 km || 
|-id=709 bgcolor=#d6d6d6
| 424709 ||  || — || September 21, 2008 || Kitt Peak || Spacewatch || — || align=right | 2.6 km || 
|-id=710 bgcolor=#d6d6d6
| 424710 ||  || — || September 21, 2008 || Kitt Peak || Spacewatch || VER || align=right | 2.1 km || 
|-id=711 bgcolor=#E9E9E9
| 424711 ||  || — || August 21, 2008 || Kitt Peak || Spacewatch || ADE || align=right | 1.8 km || 
|-id=712 bgcolor=#E9E9E9
| 424712 ||  || — || September 22, 2008 || Mount Lemmon || Mount Lemmon Survey ||  || align=right | 1.9 km || 
|-id=713 bgcolor=#E9E9E9
| 424713 ||  || — || September 22, 2008 || Mount Lemmon || Mount Lemmon Survey || — || align=right | 1.7 km || 
|-id=714 bgcolor=#d6d6d6
| 424714 ||  || — || September 22, 2008 || Mount Lemmon || Mount Lemmon Survey || — || align=right | 2.3 km || 
|-id=715 bgcolor=#d6d6d6
| 424715 ||  || — || September 22, 2008 || Kitt Peak || Spacewatch || — || align=right | 1.9 km || 
|-id=716 bgcolor=#d6d6d6
| 424716 ||  || — || September 24, 2008 || Mount Lemmon || Mount Lemmon Survey || — || align=right | 3.3 km || 
|-id=717 bgcolor=#E9E9E9
| 424717 ||  || — || September 23, 2008 || Kitt Peak || Spacewatch || — || align=right | 1.1 km || 
|-id=718 bgcolor=#d6d6d6
| 424718 ||  || — || September 30, 2003 || Kitt Peak || Spacewatch || EOS || align=right | 2.1 km || 
|-id=719 bgcolor=#d6d6d6
| 424719 ||  || — || September 28, 2008 || Socorro || LINEAR || EMA || align=right | 2.7 km || 
|-id=720 bgcolor=#E9E9E9
| 424720 ||  || — || September 24, 2008 || Kitt Peak || Spacewatch || — || align=right | 1.9 km || 
|-id=721 bgcolor=#d6d6d6
| 424721 ||  || — || September 20, 2008 || Kitt Peak || Spacewatch || — || align=right | 2.6 km || 
|-id=722 bgcolor=#E9E9E9
| 424722 ||  || — || September 25, 2008 || Kitt Peak || Spacewatch || — || align=right | 2.3 km || 
|-id=723 bgcolor=#d6d6d6
| 424723 ||  || — || September 25, 2008 || Kitt Peak || Spacewatch || — || align=right | 3.5 km || 
|-id=724 bgcolor=#E9E9E9
| 424724 ||  || — || September 25, 2008 || Kitt Peak || Spacewatch || WIT || align=right | 1.0 km || 
|-id=725 bgcolor=#E9E9E9
| 424725 ||  || — || September 26, 2008 || Kitt Peak || Spacewatch || — || align=right | 2.9 km || 
|-id=726 bgcolor=#d6d6d6
| 424726 ||  || — || September 27, 2008 || Mount Lemmon || Mount Lemmon Survey || EOS || align=right | 1.7 km || 
|-id=727 bgcolor=#E9E9E9
| 424727 ||  || — || October 12, 2004 || Kitt Peak || Spacewatch || — || align=right | 2.1 km || 
|-id=728 bgcolor=#E9E9E9
| 424728 ||  || — || September 5, 2008 || Kitt Peak || Spacewatch || — || align=right | 2.7 km || 
|-id=729 bgcolor=#E9E9E9
| 424729 ||  || — || September 28, 2008 || Mount Lemmon || Mount Lemmon Survey || — || align=right | 1.6 km || 
|-id=730 bgcolor=#d6d6d6
| 424730 ||  || — || August 22, 2008 || Kitt Peak || Spacewatch || — || align=right | 2.7 km || 
|-id=731 bgcolor=#d6d6d6
| 424731 ||  || — || September 29, 2008 || Kitt Peak || Spacewatch || — || align=right | 2.8 km || 
|-id=732 bgcolor=#E9E9E9
| 424732 ||  || — || September 24, 2008 || Kitt Peak || Spacewatch || — || align=right | 2.0 km || 
|-id=733 bgcolor=#fefefe
| 424733 ||  || — || September 24, 2008 || Kitt Peak || Spacewatch || H || align=right data-sort-value="0.82" | 820 m || 
|-id=734 bgcolor=#d6d6d6
| 424734 ||  || — || September 5, 2008 || Kitt Peak || Spacewatch || VER || align=right | 2.6 km || 
|-id=735 bgcolor=#d6d6d6
| 424735 ||  || — || September 24, 2008 || Kitt Peak || Spacewatch || KOR || align=right data-sort-value="0.99" | 990 m || 
|-id=736 bgcolor=#d6d6d6
| 424736 ||  || — || September 24, 2008 || Kitt Peak || Spacewatch || KOR || align=right | 1.4 km || 
|-id=737 bgcolor=#d6d6d6
| 424737 ||  || — || September 22, 2008 || Mount Lemmon || Mount Lemmon Survey || — || align=right | 2.5 km || 
|-id=738 bgcolor=#d6d6d6
| 424738 ||  || — || September 25, 2008 || Kitt Peak || Spacewatch || — || align=right | 3.5 km || 
|-id=739 bgcolor=#d6d6d6
| 424739 ||  || — || September 30, 2008 || Mount Lemmon || Mount Lemmon Survey || EOS || align=right | 1.8 km || 
|-id=740 bgcolor=#d6d6d6
| 424740 ||  || — || September 22, 2008 || Mount Lemmon || Mount Lemmon Survey || — || align=right | 2.7 km || 
|-id=741 bgcolor=#d6d6d6
| 424741 ||  || — || September 22, 2008 || Mount Lemmon || Mount Lemmon Survey || — || align=right | 2.3 km || 
|-id=742 bgcolor=#d6d6d6
| 424742 ||  || — || September 22, 2008 || Catalina || CSS || — || align=right | 2.8 km || 
|-id=743 bgcolor=#d6d6d6
| 424743 ||  || — || September 22, 2008 || Socorro || LINEAR || — || align=right | 4.0 km || 
|-id=744 bgcolor=#E9E9E9
| 424744 ||  || — || September 23, 2008 || Catalina || CSS || — || align=right | 2.1 km || 
|-id=745 bgcolor=#E9E9E9
| 424745 ||  || — || September 23, 2008 || Catalina || CSS || — || align=right | 3.3 km || 
|-id=746 bgcolor=#d6d6d6
| 424746 ||  || — || September 23, 2008 || Kitt Peak || Spacewatch || — || align=right | 2.2 km || 
|-id=747 bgcolor=#d6d6d6
| 424747 ||  || — || September 26, 2008 || Kitt Peak || Spacewatch || BRA || align=right | 1.4 km || 
|-id=748 bgcolor=#d6d6d6
| 424748 ||  || — || September 27, 2008 || Mount Lemmon || Mount Lemmon Survey || — || align=right | 2.8 km || 
|-id=749 bgcolor=#fefefe
| 424749 ||  || — || October 2, 2008 || Socorro || LINEAR || H || align=right data-sort-value="0.93" | 930 m || 
|-id=750 bgcolor=#E9E9E9
| 424750 ||  || — || September 21, 2008 || Mount Lemmon || Mount Lemmon Survey || ADE || align=right | 2.4 km || 
|-id=751 bgcolor=#E9E9E9
| 424751 ||  || — || October 1, 2008 || Mount Lemmon || Mount Lemmon Survey || MRX || align=right | 1.0 km || 
|-id=752 bgcolor=#d6d6d6
| 424752 ||  || — || October 1, 2008 || Kitt Peak || Spacewatch || KOR || align=right | 1.1 km || 
|-id=753 bgcolor=#d6d6d6
| 424753 ||  || — || October 1, 2008 || Mount Lemmon || Mount Lemmon Survey || — || align=right | 2.7 km || 
|-id=754 bgcolor=#d6d6d6
| 424754 ||  || — || October 1, 2008 || Catalina || CSS || — || align=right | 2.8 km || 
|-id=755 bgcolor=#d6d6d6
| 424755 ||  || — || October 1, 2008 || Mount Lemmon || Mount Lemmon Survey || — || align=right | 2.5 km || 
|-id=756 bgcolor=#d6d6d6
| 424756 ||  || — || October 1, 2008 || Mount Lemmon || Mount Lemmon Survey || EOS || align=right | 1.8 km || 
|-id=757 bgcolor=#d6d6d6
| 424757 ||  || — || October 2, 2008 || Kitt Peak || Spacewatch || EOS || align=right | 1.6 km || 
|-id=758 bgcolor=#d6d6d6
| 424758 ||  || — || September 20, 2008 || Mount Lemmon || Mount Lemmon Survey || KOR || align=right | 1.2 km || 
|-id=759 bgcolor=#d6d6d6
| 424759 ||  || — || October 2, 2008 || Kitt Peak || Spacewatch || — || align=right | 2.5 km || 
|-id=760 bgcolor=#d6d6d6
| 424760 ||  || — || October 2, 2008 || Kitt Peak || Spacewatch || KOR || align=right | 1.4 km || 
|-id=761 bgcolor=#d6d6d6
| 424761 ||  || — || September 23, 2008 || Kitt Peak || Spacewatch || — || align=right | 2.6 km || 
|-id=762 bgcolor=#d6d6d6
| 424762 ||  || — || September 23, 2008 || Kitt Peak || Spacewatch || — || align=right | 2.7 km || 
|-id=763 bgcolor=#d6d6d6
| 424763 ||  || — || October 2, 2008 || Kitt Peak || Spacewatch || — || align=right | 1.7 km || 
|-id=764 bgcolor=#E9E9E9
| 424764 ||  || — || October 2, 2008 || Mount Lemmon || Mount Lemmon Survey || — || align=right | 2.4 km || 
|-id=765 bgcolor=#E9E9E9
| 424765 ||  || — || September 23, 2008 || Mount Lemmon || Mount Lemmon Survey || — || align=right | 1.9 km || 
|-id=766 bgcolor=#d6d6d6
| 424766 ||  || — || September 23, 2008 || Mount Lemmon || Mount Lemmon Survey || KOR || align=right | 1.5 km || 
|-id=767 bgcolor=#E9E9E9
| 424767 ||  || — || October 2, 2008 || Mount Lemmon || Mount Lemmon Survey || — || align=right | 2.2 km || 
|-id=768 bgcolor=#d6d6d6
| 424768 ||  || — || October 3, 2008 || Mount Lemmon || Mount Lemmon Survey || — || align=right | 2.4 km || 
|-id=769 bgcolor=#E9E9E9
| 424769 ||  || — || October 3, 2008 || Mount Lemmon || Mount Lemmon Survey || — || align=right | 2.8 km || 
|-id=770 bgcolor=#d6d6d6
| 424770 ||  || — || September 26, 2008 || Kitt Peak || Spacewatch || — || align=right | 2.5 km || 
|-id=771 bgcolor=#d6d6d6
| 424771 ||  || — || October 3, 2008 || Kitt Peak || Spacewatch || — || align=right | 2.9 km || 
|-id=772 bgcolor=#E9E9E9
| 424772 ||  || — || September 26, 2008 || Kitt Peak || Spacewatch || — || align=right | 2.3 km || 
|-id=773 bgcolor=#E9E9E9
| 424773 ||  || — || September 26, 2008 || Kitt Peak || Spacewatch || AGN || align=right | 1.6 km || 
|-id=774 bgcolor=#E9E9E9
| 424774 ||  || — || October 6, 2008 || Kitt Peak || Spacewatch || PAD || align=right | 1.4 km || 
|-id=775 bgcolor=#d6d6d6
| 424775 ||  || — || October 6, 2008 || Kitt Peak || Spacewatch || — || align=right | 2.3 km || 
|-id=776 bgcolor=#d6d6d6
| 424776 ||  || — || October 6, 2008 || Mount Lemmon || Mount Lemmon Survey || — || align=right | 2.3 km || 
|-id=777 bgcolor=#d6d6d6
| 424777 ||  || — || September 23, 2008 || Mount Lemmon || Mount Lemmon Survey || EOS || align=right | 1.6 km || 
|-id=778 bgcolor=#d6d6d6
| 424778 ||  || — || October 6, 2008 || Mount Lemmon || Mount Lemmon Survey || EOS || align=right | 1.8 km || 
|-id=779 bgcolor=#d6d6d6
| 424779 ||  || — || September 23, 2008 || Kitt Peak || Spacewatch || — || align=right | 2.4 km || 
|-id=780 bgcolor=#E9E9E9
| 424780 ||  || — || October 7, 2008 || Kitt Peak || Spacewatch || — || align=right | 2.4 km || 
|-id=781 bgcolor=#d6d6d6
| 424781 ||  || — || October 8, 2008 || Mount Lemmon || Mount Lemmon Survey || EOS || align=right | 1.9 km || 
|-id=782 bgcolor=#E9E9E9
| 424782 ||  || — || September 23, 2008 || Kitt Peak || Spacewatch || — || align=right | 2.2 km || 
|-id=783 bgcolor=#E9E9E9
| 424783 ||  || — || October 9, 2008 || Mount Lemmon || Mount Lemmon Survey || AGN || align=right | 1.3 km || 
|-id=784 bgcolor=#d6d6d6
| 424784 ||  || — || November 26, 2003 || Kitt Peak || Spacewatch || — || align=right | 2.1 km || 
|-id=785 bgcolor=#d6d6d6
| 424785 ||  || — || October 9, 2008 || Mount Lemmon || Mount Lemmon Survey || — || align=right | 4.0 km || 
|-id=786 bgcolor=#d6d6d6
| 424786 ||  || — || October 9, 2008 || Mount Lemmon || Mount Lemmon Survey || — || align=right | 3.3 km || 
|-id=787 bgcolor=#E9E9E9
| 424787 ||  || — || October 1, 2008 || Kitt Peak || Spacewatch || — || align=right | 2.0 km || 
|-id=788 bgcolor=#E9E9E9
| 424788 ||  || — || October 8, 2008 || Kitt Peak || Spacewatch || — || align=right | 2.0 km || 
|-id=789 bgcolor=#d6d6d6
| 424789 ||  || — || October 6, 2008 || Kitt Peak || Spacewatch || KOR || align=right | 1.3 km || 
|-id=790 bgcolor=#E9E9E9
| 424790 ||  || — || September 27, 2003 || Kitt Peak || Spacewatch || — || align=right | 1.7 km || 
|-id=791 bgcolor=#d6d6d6
| 424791 ||  || — || April 2, 2006 || Kitt Peak || Spacewatch || — || align=right | 3.4 km || 
|-id=792 bgcolor=#d6d6d6
| 424792 ||  || — || October 9, 2008 || Mount Lemmon || Mount Lemmon Survey || — || align=right | 2.2 km || 
|-id=793 bgcolor=#d6d6d6
| 424793 ||  || — || October 10, 2008 || Mount Lemmon || Mount Lemmon Survey || — || align=right | 3.0 km || 
|-id=794 bgcolor=#E9E9E9
| 424794 ||  || — || October 17, 2008 || Kitt Peak || Spacewatch || — || align=right | 2.8 km || 
|-id=795 bgcolor=#d6d6d6
| 424795 ||  || — || September 24, 2008 || Mount Lemmon || Mount Lemmon Survey || EMA || align=right | 3.3 km || 
|-id=796 bgcolor=#E9E9E9
| 424796 ||  || — || October 20, 2008 || Kitt Peak || Spacewatch || — || align=right | 2.2 km || 
|-id=797 bgcolor=#d6d6d6
| 424797 ||  || — || October 20, 2008 || Kitt Peak || Spacewatch || — || align=right | 2.5 km || 
|-id=798 bgcolor=#d6d6d6
| 424798 ||  || — || October 6, 2008 || Mount Lemmon || Mount Lemmon Survey || — || align=right | 2.8 km || 
|-id=799 bgcolor=#d6d6d6
| 424799 ||  || — || October 20, 2008 || Kitt Peak || Spacewatch || — || align=right | 3.1 km || 
|-id=800 bgcolor=#d6d6d6
| 424800 ||  || — || September 21, 2008 || Kitt Peak || Spacewatch || — || align=right | 2.4 km || 
|}

424801–424900 

|-bgcolor=#E9E9E9
| 424801 ||  || — || September 29, 2008 || Mount Lemmon || Mount Lemmon Survey || — || align=right | 2.7 km || 
|-id=802 bgcolor=#d6d6d6
| 424802 ||  || — || September 25, 2008 || Mount Lemmon || Mount Lemmon Survey || — || align=right | 2.2 km || 
|-id=803 bgcolor=#d6d6d6
| 424803 ||  || — || October 21, 2008 || Kitt Peak || Spacewatch || — || align=right | 3.2 km || 
|-id=804 bgcolor=#d6d6d6
| 424804 ||  || — || October 21, 2008 || Kitt Peak || Spacewatch || — || align=right | 2.2 km || 
|-id=805 bgcolor=#d6d6d6
| 424805 ||  || — || October 21, 2008 || Kitt Peak || Spacewatch || — || align=right | 3.0 km || 
|-id=806 bgcolor=#E9E9E9
| 424806 ||  || — || January 28, 2006 || Kitt Peak || Spacewatch || — || align=right | 2.0 km || 
|-id=807 bgcolor=#d6d6d6
| 424807 ||  || — || September 5, 2008 || Kitt Peak || Spacewatch || THM || align=right | 2.5 km || 
|-id=808 bgcolor=#d6d6d6
| 424808 ||  || — || October 21, 2008 || Kitt Peak || Spacewatch || KOR || align=right | 1.4 km || 
|-id=809 bgcolor=#E9E9E9
| 424809 ||  || — || October 22, 2008 || Kitt Peak || Spacewatch || — || align=right | 2.4 km || 
|-id=810 bgcolor=#d6d6d6
| 424810 ||  || — || October 22, 2008 || Kitt Peak || Spacewatch || — || align=right | 3.1 km || 
|-id=811 bgcolor=#d6d6d6
| 424811 ||  || — || October 22, 2008 || Kitt Peak || Spacewatch || — || align=right | 2.8 km || 
|-id=812 bgcolor=#d6d6d6
| 424812 ||  || — || October 22, 2008 || Kitt Peak || Spacewatch || — || align=right | 2.3 km || 
|-id=813 bgcolor=#E9E9E9
| 424813 ||  || — || October 23, 2008 || Kitt Peak || Spacewatch || — || align=right | 1.7 km || 
|-id=814 bgcolor=#E9E9E9
| 424814 ||  || — || October 23, 2008 || Kitt Peak || Spacewatch || — || align=right | 2.0 km || 
|-id=815 bgcolor=#E9E9E9
| 424815 ||  || — || October 23, 2008 || Kitt Peak || Spacewatch || — || align=right | 2.5 km || 
|-id=816 bgcolor=#d6d6d6
| 424816 ||  || — || October 23, 2008 || Kitt Peak || Spacewatch || — || align=right | 2.7 km || 
|-id=817 bgcolor=#E9E9E9
| 424817 ||  || — || October 23, 2008 || Kitt Peak || Spacewatch || — || align=right | 2.5 km || 
|-id=818 bgcolor=#d6d6d6
| 424818 ||  || — || September 22, 2008 || Mount Lemmon || Mount Lemmon Survey || VER || align=right | 2.7 km || 
|-id=819 bgcolor=#E9E9E9
| 424819 ||  || — || October 23, 2008 || Kitt Peak || Spacewatch || JUN || align=right | 1.2 km || 
|-id=820 bgcolor=#E9E9E9
| 424820 ||  || — || September 23, 2008 || Kitt Peak || Spacewatch ||  || align=right | 1.9 km || 
|-id=821 bgcolor=#E9E9E9
| 424821 ||  || — || October 24, 2008 || Kitt Peak || Spacewatch || — || align=right | 2.0 km || 
|-id=822 bgcolor=#d6d6d6
| 424822 ||  || — || October 24, 2008 || Kitt Peak || Spacewatch || EOS || align=right | 3.6 km || 
|-id=823 bgcolor=#E9E9E9
| 424823 ||  || — || October 1, 2008 || Kitt Peak || Spacewatch || — || align=right | 2.2 km || 
|-id=824 bgcolor=#d6d6d6
| 424824 ||  || — || September 23, 2008 || Kitt Peak || Spacewatch || — || align=right | 2.8 km || 
|-id=825 bgcolor=#d6d6d6
| 424825 ||  || — || October 24, 2008 || Kitt Peak || Spacewatch || — || align=right | 3.4 km || 
|-id=826 bgcolor=#d6d6d6
| 424826 ||  || — || October 27, 2008 || Socorro || LINEAR || Tj (2.91) || align=right | 3.6 km || 
|-id=827 bgcolor=#d6d6d6
| 424827 ||  || — || September 22, 2008 || Mount Lemmon || Mount Lemmon Survey || — || align=right | 3.7 km || 
|-id=828 bgcolor=#d6d6d6
| 424828 ||  || — || October 23, 2008 || Kitt Peak || Spacewatch || KOR || align=right | 1.3 km || 
|-id=829 bgcolor=#E9E9E9
| 424829 ||  || — || October 25, 2008 || Kitt Peak || Spacewatch || HOF || align=right | 3.1 km || 
|-id=830 bgcolor=#d6d6d6
| 424830 ||  || — || October 25, 2008 || Kitt Peak || Spacewatch || — || align=right | 3.2 km || 
|-id=831 bgcolor=#d6d6d6
| 424831 ||  || — || September 29, 2008 || Mount Lemmon || Mount Lemmon Survey || — || align=right | 3.2 km || 
|-id=832 bgcolor=#d6d6d6
| 424832 ||  || — || October 26, 2008 || Kitt Peak || Spacewatch || — || align=right | 2.9 km || 
|-id=833 bgcolor=#d6d6d6
| 424833 ||  || — || October 26, 2008 || Kitt Peak || Spacewatch || — || align=right | 6.0 km || 
|-id=834 bgcolor=#E9E9E9
| 424834 ||  || — || August 20, 2003 || Campo Imperatore || CINEOS || — || align=right | 1.7 km || 
|-id=835 bgcolor=#E9E9E9
| 424835 ||  || — || October 7, 2008 || Kitt Peak || Spacewatch || — || align=right | 1.8 km || 
|-id=836 bgcolor=#d6d6d6
| 424836 ||  || — || September 23, 2008 || Kitt Peak || Spacewatch || — || align=right | 2.3 km || 
|-id=837 bgcolor=#d6d6d6
| 424837 ||  || — || October 27, 2008 || Kitt Peak || Spacewatch || — || align=right | 2.4 km || 
|-id=838 bgcolor=#d6d6d6
| 424838 ||  || — || October 27, 2008 || Kitt Peak || Spacewatch || — || align=right | 2.1 km || 
|-id=839 bgcolor=#E9E9E9
| 424839 ||  || — || October 27, 2008 || Mount Lemmon || Mount Lemmon Survey || — || align=right | 1.7 km || 
|-id=840 bgcolor=#d6d6d6
| 424840 ||  || — || October 28, 2008 || Kitt Peak || Spacewatch || — || align=right | 4.4 km || 
|-id=841 bgcolor=#d6d6d6
| 424841 ||  || — || October 28, 2008 || Kitt Peak || Spacewatch || — || align=right | 2.6 km || 
|-id=842 bgcolor=#E9E9E9
| 424842 ||  || — || March 4, 2006 || Mount Lemmon || Mount Lemmon Survey || — || align=right | 2.2 km || 
|-id=843 bgcolor=#E9E9E9
| 424843 ||  || — || October 28, 2008 || Mount Lemmon || Mount Lemmon Survey || — || align=right | 1.5 km || 
|-id=844 bgcolor=#E9E9E9
| 424844 ||  || — || September 29, 2008 || Kitt Peak || Spacewatch || HOF || align=right | 2.6 km || 
|-id=845 bgcolor=#d6d6d6
| 424845 ||  || — || October 28, 2008 || Mount Lemmon || Mount Lemmon Survey || — || align=right | 2.3 km || 
|-id=846 bgcolor=#d6d6d6
| 424846 ||  || — || October 28, 2008 || Mount Lemmon || Mount Lemmon Survey || EOS || align=right | 1.5 km || 
|-id=847 bgcolor=#d6d6d6
| 424847 ||  || — || October 29, 2008 || Kitt Peak || Spacewatch || VER || align=right | 2.4 km || 
|-id=848 bgcolor=#d6d6d6
| 424848 ||  || — || October 29, 2008 || Kitt Peak || Spacewatch || — || align=right | 2.4 km || 
|-id=849 bgcolor=#d6d6d6
| 424849 ||  || — || September 28, 1997 || Kitt Peak || Spacewatch || — || align=right | 2.7 km || 
|-id=850 bgcolor=#d6d6d6
| 424850 ||  || — || October 31, 2008 || Kitt Peak || Spacewatch || — || align=right | 3.4 km || 
|-id=851 bgcolor=#d6d6d6
| 424851 ||  || — || October 29, 2008 || Catalina || CSS || Tj (2.91) || align=right | 2.8 km || 
|-id=852 bgcolor=#E9E9E9
| 424852 ||  || — || October 22, 2008 || Kitt Peak || Spacewatch || — || align=right | 2.2 km || 
|-id=853 bgcolor=#d6d6d6
| 424853 ||  || — || October 20, 2008 || Kitt Peak || Spacewatch || — || align=right | 2.2 km || 
|-id=854 bgcolor=#d6d6d6
| 424854 ||  || — || October 22, 2008 || Kitt Peak || Spacewatch || — || align=right | 2.3 km || 
|-id=855 bgcolor=#d6d6d6
| 424855 ||  || — || October 31, 2008 || Kitt Peak || Spacewatch || EOS || align=right | 2.5 km || 
|-id=856 bgcolor=#d6d6d6
| 424856 ||  || — || October 23, 2008 || Mount Lemmon || Mount Lemmon Survey || — || align=right | 1.8 km || 
|-id=857 bgcolor=#d6d6d6
| 424857 ||  || — || October 31, 2008 || Kitt Peak || Spacewatch || — || align=right | 2.8 km || 
|-id=858 bgcolor=#d6d6d6
| 424858 ||  || — || October 26, 2008 || Mount Lemmon || Mount Lemmon Survey || — || align=right | 2.9 km || 
|-id=859 bgcolor=#d6d6d6
| 424859 ||  || — || October 20, 2008 || Kitt Peak || Spacewatch || — || align=right | 2.2 km || 
|-id=860 bgcolor=#d6d6d6
| 424860 ||  || — || October 25, 2008 || Kitt Peak || Spacewatch || EOS || align=right | 2.0 km || 
|-id=861 bgcolor=#d6d6d6
| 424861 ||  || — || October 26, 2008 || Kitt Peak || Spacewatch || — || align=right | 2.2 km || 
|-id=862 bgcolor=#d6d6d6
| 424862 ||  || — || October 9, 2008 || Catalina || CSS || — || align=right | 2.8 km || 
|-id=863 bgcolor=#d6d6d6
| 424863 ||  || — || October 26, 2008 || Mount Lemmon || Mount Lemmon Survey || Tj (2.95) || align=right | 2.8 km || 
|-id=864 bgcolor=#d6d6d6
| 424864 ||  || — || November 1, 2008 || Mount Lemmon || Mount Lemmon Survey || — || align=right | 3.1 km || 
|-id=865 bgcolor=#d6d6d6
| 424865 ||  || — || September 25, 2008 || Kitt Peak || Spacewatch || — || align=right | 2.9 km || 
|-id=866 bgcolor=#d6d6d6
| 424866 ||  || — || November 2, 2008 || Kitt Peak || Spacewatch || — || align=right | 2.5 km || 
|-id=867 bgcolor=#d6d6d6
| 424867 ||  || — || November 2, 2008 || Kitt Peak || Spacewatch || VER || align=right | 3.3 km || 
|-id=868 bgcolor=#d6d6d6
| 424868 ||  || — || November 2, 2008 || Mount Lemmon || Mount Lemmon Survey || — || align=right | 2.5 km || 
|-id=869 bgcolor=#d6d6d6
| 424869 ||  || — || October 10, 2008 || Mount Lemmon || Mount Lemmon Survey || — || align=right | 2.8 km || 
|-id=870 bgcolor=#d6d6d6
| 424870 ||  || — || November 2, 2008 || Kitt Peak || Spacewatch || (1118) || align=right | 4.7 km || 
|-id=871 bgcolor=#d6d6d6
| 424871 ||  || — || September 23, 2008 || Kitt Peak || Spacewatch || — || align=right | 2.1 km || 
|-id=872 bgcolor=#d6d6d6
| 424872 ||  || — || October 25, 2008 || Kitt Peak || Spacewatch || — || align=right | 3.1 km || 
|-id=873 bgcolor=#d6d6d6
| 424873 ||  || — || November 6, 2008 || Mount Lemmon || Mount Lemmon Survey || EOS || align=right | 2.1 km || 
|-id=874 bgcolor=#d6d6d6
| 424874 ||  || — || October 24, 2008 || Catalina || CSS || — || align=right | 2.5 km || 
|-id=875 bgcolor=#d6d6d6
| 424875 ||  || — || November 8, 2008 || Kitt Peak || Spacewatch || — || align=right | 2.7 km || 
|-id=876 bgcolor=#d6d6d6
| 424876 ||  || — || November 8, 2008 || Kitt Peak || Spacewatch || — || align=right | 2.8 km || 
|-id=877 bgcolor=#d6d6d6
| 424877 ||  || — || November 9, 2008 || Kitt Peak || Spacewatch || VER || align=right | 2.9 km || 
|-id=878 bgcolor=#d6d6d6
| 424878 ||  || — || November 8, 2008 || Catalina || CSS || — || align=right | 3.5 km || 
|-id=879 bgcolor=#d6d6d6
| 424879 ||  || — || November 1, 2008 || Mount Lemmon || Mount Lemmon Survey || — || align=right | 2.4 km || 
|-id=880 bgcolor=#d6d6d6
| 424880 ||  || — || November 7, 2008 || Mount Lemmon || Mount Lemmon Survey || KOR || align=right | 1.4 km || 
|-id=881 bgcolor=#d6d6d6
| 424881 ||  || — || November 7, 2008 || Mount Lemmon || Mount Lemmon Survey || — || align=right | 3.2 km || 
|-id=882 bgcolor=#d6d6d6
| 424882 ||  || — || November 2, 2008 || Mount Lemmon || Mount Lemmon Survey || — || align=right | 3.0 km || 
|-id=883 bgcolor=#d6d6d6
| 424883 ||  || — || November 2, 2008 || Mount Lemmon || Mount Lemmon Survey || — || align=right | 3.0 km || 
|-id=884 bgcolor=#d6d6d6
| 424884 ||  || — || November 7, 2008 || Mount Lemmon || Mount Lemmon Survey || — || align=right | 3.2 km || 
|-id=885 bgcolor=#d6d6d6
| 424885 ||  || — || November 2, 2008 || Socorro || LINEAR || — || align=right | 4.0 km || 
|-id=886 bgcolor=#d6d6d6
| 424886 ||  || — || November 2, 2008 || Mount Lemmon || Mount Lemmon Survey || 7:4 || align=right | 5.7 km || 
|-id=887 bgcolor=#d6d6d6
| 424887 ||  || — || September 22, 2008 || Mount Lemmon || Mount Lemmon Survey || THM || align=right | 2.0 km || 
|-id=888 bgcolor=#d6d6d6
| 424888 ||  || — || November 18, 2008 || Catalina || CSS || — || align=right | 2.9 km || 
|-id=889 bgcolor=#d6d6d6
| 424889 ||  || — || November 17, 2008 || Kitt Peak || Spacewatch || Tj (2.99) || align=right | 4.9 km || 
|-id=890 bgcolor=#d6d6d6
| 424890 ||  || — || November 18, 2008 || Catalina || CSS || — || align=right | 2.7 km || 
|-id=891 bgcolor=#d6d6d6
| 424891 ||  || — || November 19, 2008 || Kitt Peak || Spacewatch || — || align=right | 3.1 km || 
|-id=892 bgcolor=#d6d6d6
| 424892 ||  || — || November 21, 2008 || Pla D'Arguines || R. Ferrando || VER || align=right | 3.7 km || 
|-id=893 bgcolor=#d6d6d6
| 424893 ||  || — || October 2, 2008 || Kitt Peak || Spacewatch || HYG || align=right | 2.8 km || 
|-id=894 bgcolor=#d6d6d6
| 424894 ||  || — || November 17, 2008 || Kitt Peak || Spacewatch || THM || align=right | 2.1 km || 
|-id=895 bgcolor=#d6d6d6
| 424895 ||  || — || November 17, 2008 || Kitt Peak || Spacewatch || — || align=right | 2.3 km || 
|-id=896 bgcolor=#d6d6d6
| 424896 ||  || — || October 27, 2008 || Kitt Peak || Spacewatch || — || align=right | 3.6 km || 
|-id=897 bgcolor=#d6d6d6
| 424897 ||  || — || November 17, 2008 || Kitt Peak || Spacewatch || — || align=right | 1.7 km || 
|-id=898 bgcolor=#d6d6d6
| 424898 ||  || — || November 17, 2008 || Kitt Peak || Spacewatch || — || align=right | 2.6 km || 
|-id=899 bgcolor=#d6d6d6
| 424899 ||  || — || November 17, 2008 || Kitt Peak || Spacewatch || THM || align=right | 2.2 km || 
|-id=900 bgcolor=#d6d6d6
| 424900 ||  || — || November 18, 2008 || Kitt Peak || Spacewatch || — || align=right | 2.3 km || 
|}

424901–425000 

|-bgcolor=#d6d6d6
| 424901 ||  || — || November 9, 2008 || Kitt Peak || Spacewatch || TEL || align=right | 1.3 km || 
|-id=902 bgcolor=#d6d6d6
| 424902 ||  || — || October 23, 2008 || Mount Lemmon || Mount Lemmon Survey || — || align=right | 2.0 km || 
|-id=903 bgcolor=#d6d6d6
| 424903 ||  || — || November 22, 2008 || Farra d'Isonzo || Farra d'Isonzo || — || align=right | 5.3 km || 
|-id=904 bgcolor=#d6d6d6
| 424904 ||  || — || November 23, 2008 || La Sagra || OAM Obs. || — || align=right | 3.6 km || 
|-id=905 bgcolor=#d6d6d6
| 424905 ||  || — || November 21, 2008 || Bisei SG Center || BATTeRS || — || align=right | 4.8 km || 
|-id=906 bgcolor=#d6d6d6
| 424906 ||  || — || October 6, 2008 || Mount Lemmon || Mount Lemmon Survey || — || align=right | 2.9 km || 
|-id=907 bgcolor=#d6d6d6
| 424907 ||  || — || November 18, 2008 || Kitt Peak || Spacewatch || — || align=right | 3.1 km || 
|-id=908 bgcolor=#d6d6d6
| 424908 ||  || — || March 16, 2005 || Mount Lemmon || Mount Lemmon Survey || — || align=right | 2.5 km || 
|-id=909 bgcolor=#d6d6d6
| 424909 ||  || — || November 20, 2008 || Kitt Peak || Spacewatch || EOS || align=right | 1.7 km || 
|-id=910 bgcolor=#d6d6d6
| 424910 ||  || — || November 20, 2008 || Kitt Peak || Spacewatch || — || align=right | 2.8 km || 
|-id=911 bgcolor=#d6d6d6
| 424911 ||  || — || November 20, 2008 || Kitt Peak || Spacewatch || EOS || align=right | 1.9 km || 
|-id=912 bgcolor=#d6d6d6
| 424912 ||  || — || September 28, 2008 || Mount Lemmon || Mount Lemmon Survey || — || align=right | 2.8 km || 
|-id=913 bgcolor=#d6d6d6
| 424913 ||  || — || November 21, 2008 || Mount Lemmon || Mount Lemmon Survey || — || align=right | 2.5 km || 
|-id=914 bgcolor=#d6d6d6
| 424914 ||  || — || May 8, 2006 || Mount Lemmon || Mount Lemmon Survey || — || align=right | 2.9 km || 
|-id=915 bgcolor=#d6d6d6
| 424915 ||  || — || November 25, 2008 || Cerro Burek || Alianza S4 Obs. || — || align=right | 2.6 km || 
|-id=916 bgcolor=#d6d6d6
| 424916 ||  || — || November 24, 2008 || Kitt Peak || Spacewatch || — || align=right | 3.6 km || 
|-id=917 bgcolor=#d6d6d6
| 424917 ||  || — || November 18, 2008 || Kitt Peak || Spacewatch || — || align=right | 2.2 km || 
|-id=918 bgcolor=#d6d6d6
| 424918 ||  || — || November 19, 2008 || Kitt Peak || Spacewatch || URS || align=right | 4.0 km || 
|-id=919 bgcolor=#d6d6d6
| 424919 ||  || — || November 30, 2008 || Socorro || LINEAR || — || align=right | 3.8 km || 
|-id=920 bgcolor=#d6d6d6
| 424920 ||  || — || December 1, 2008 || Kitt Peak || Spacewatch || — || align=right | 4.5 km || 
|-id=921 bgcolor=#E9E9E9
| 424921 ||  || — || December 3, 2008 || Kitt Peak || Spacewatch || — || align=right | 2.7 km || 
|-id=922 bgcolor=#d6d6d6
| 424922 ||  || — || October 30, 2008 || Kitt Peak || Spacewatch || — || align=right | 3.6 km || 
|-id=923 bgcolor=#d6d6d6
| 424923 ||  || — || November 22, 2008 || Kitt Peak || Spacewatch || — || align=right | 4.7 km || 
|-id=924 bgcolor=#d6d6d6
| 424924 ||  || — || October 3, 2008 || Mount Lemmon || Mount Lemmon Survey || — || align=right | 3.5 km || 
|-id=925 bgcolor=#d6d6d6
| 424925 ||  || — || November 24, 2008 || Mount Lemmon || Mount Lemmon Survey || — || align=right | 2.9 km || 
|-id=926 bgcolor=#d6d6d6
| 424926 ||  || — || November 19, 2008 || Mount Lemmon || Mount Lemmon Survey || — || align=right | 3.2 km || 
|-id=927 bgcolor=#d6d6d6
| 424927 ||  || — || December 22, 2008 || Dauban || F. Kugel || — || align=right | 3.2 km || 
|-id=928 bgcolor=#d6d6d6
| 424928 ||  || — || November 30, 2008 || Kitt Peak || Spacewatch || — || align=right | 2.4 km || 
|-id=929 bgcolor=#d6d6d6
| 424929 ||  || — || November 30, 2008 || Kitt Peak || Spacewatch || — || align=right | 3.5 km || 
|-id=930 bgcolor=#d6d6d6
| 424930 ||  || — || December 21, 2008 || Mount Lemmon || Mount Lemmon Survey || — || align=right | 2.7 km || 
|-id=931 bgcolor=#d6d6d6
| 424931 ||  || — || December 21, 2008 || Mount Lemmon || Mount Lemmon Survey || — || align=right | 6.3 km || 
|-id=932 bgcolor=#d6d6d6
| 424932 ||  || — || October 31, 2008 || Mount Lemmon || Mount Lemmon Survey || — || align=right | 2.8 km || 
|-id=933 bgcolor=#d6d6d6
| 424933 ||  || — || October 18, 2007 || Mount Lemmon || Mount Lemmon Survey || THM || align=right | 2.4 km || 
|-id=934 bgcolor=#d6d6d6
| 424934 ||  || — || December 30, 2008 || Kitt Peak || Spacewatch || THM || align=right | 2.1 km || 
|-id=935 bgcolor=#d6d6d6
| 424935 ||  || — || December 30, 2008 || Mount Lemmon || Mount Lemmon Survey || — || align=right | 3.0 km || 
|-id=936 bgcolor=#fefefe
| 424936 ||  || — || December 30, 2008 || Mount Lemmon || Mount Lemmon Survey || — || align=right data-sort-value="0.76" | 760 m || 
|-id=937 bgcolor=#d6d6d6
| 424937 ||  || — || December 30, 2008 || Mount Lemmon || Mount Lemmon Survey || — || align=right | 3.5 km || 
|-id=938 bgcolor=#d6d6d6
| 424938 ||  || — || December 30, 2008 || Kitt Peak || Spacewatch || — || align=right | 3.2 km || 
|-id=939 bgcolor=#d6d6d6
| 424939 ||  || — || December 21, 2008 || Mount Lemmon || Mount Lemmon Survey || — || align=right | 3.0 km || 
|-id=940 bgcolor=#d6d6d6
| 424940 ||  || — || December 4, 2008 || Mount Lemmon || Mount Lemmon Survey || — || align=right | 2.9 km || 
|-id=941 bgcolor=#d6d6d6
| 424941 ||  || — || December 21, 2008 || Kitt Peak || Spacewatch || VER || align=right | 2.9 km || 
|-id=942 bgcolor=#d6d6d6
| 424942 ||  || — || December 29, 2008 || Kitt Peak || Spacewatch || — || align=right | 6.0 km || 
|-id=943 bgcolor=#d6d6d6
| 424943 ||  || — || December 29, 2008 || Kitt Peak || Spacewatch || 7:4 || align=right | 2.5 km || 
|-id=944 bgcolor=#d6d6d6
| 424944 ||  || — || December 29, 2008 || Kitt Peak || Spacewatch || — || align=right | 5.2 km || 
|-id=945 bgcolor=#d6d6d6
| 424945 ||  || — || December 29, 2008 || Kitt Peak || Spacewatch || THM || align=right | 2.3 km || 
|-id=946 bgcolor=#d6d6d6
| 424946 ||  || — || December 29, 2008 || Mount Lemmon || Mount Lemmon Survey || — || align=right | 2.6 km || 
|-id=947 bgcolor=#d6d6d6
| 424947 ||  || — || December 29, 2008 || Kitt Peak || Spacewatch || (260)7:4 || align=right | 3.6 km || 
|-id=948 bgcolor=#d6d6d6
| 424948 ||  || — || December 30, 2008 || Kitt Peak || Spacewatch || — || align=right | 5.7 km || 
|-id=949 bgcolor=#d6d6d6
| 424949 ||  || — || November 8, 2008 || Mount Lemmon || Mount Lemmon Survey || — || align=right | 2.8 km || 
|-id=950 bgcolor=#d6d6d6
| 424950 ||  || — || December 31, 2008 || Kitt Peak || Spacewatch || — || align=right | 3.2 km || 
|-id=951 bgcolor=#d6d6d6
| 424951 ||  || — || December 30, 2008 || Kitt Peak || Spacewatch || — || align=right | 3.3 km || 
|-id=952 bgcolor=#d6d6d6
| 424952 ||  || — || December 21, 2008 || Kitt Peak || Spacewatch || — || align=right | 3.5 km || 
|-id=953 bgcolor=#fefefe
| 424953 ||  || — || December 21, 2008 || Kitt Peak || Spacewatch || — || align=right data-sort-value="0.67" | 670 m || 
|-id=954 bgcolor=#d6d6d6
| 424954 ||  || — || December 21, 2008 || Kitt Peak || Spacewatch || — || align=right | 4.1 km || 
|-id=955 bgcolor=#d6d6d6
| 424955 ||  || — || December 30, 2008 || Mount Lemmon || Mount Lemmon Survey || 7:4 || align=right | 3.7 km || 
|-id=956 bgcolor=#d6d6d6
| 424956 ||  || — || December 30, 2008 || Mount Lemmon || Mount Lemmon Survey || THB || align=right | 2.8 km || 
|-id=957 bgcolor=#d6d6d6
| 424957 ||  || — || December 21, 2008 || Mount Lemmon || Mount Lemmon Survey || THM || align=right | 2.3 km || 
|-id=958 bgcolor=#d6d6d6
| 424958 ||  || — || December 30, 2008 || Kitt Peak || Spacewatch || — || align=right | 3.0 km || 
|-id=959 bgcolor=#d6d6d6
| 424959 ||  || — || December 31, 2008 || Kitt Peak || Spacewatch || — || align=right | 3.6 km || 
|-id=960 bgcolor=#d6d6d6
| 424960 ||  || — || December 22, 2008 || Mount Lemmon || Mount Lemmon Survey || — || align=right | 2.7 km || 
|-id=961 bgcolor=#d6d6d6
| 424961 ||  || — || December 22, 2008 || Mount Lemmon || Mount Lemmon Survey || — || align=right | 2.9 km || 
|-id=962 bgcolor=#d6d6d6
| 424962 ||  || — || December 30, 2008 || Mount Lemmon || Mount Lemmon Survey || — || align=right | 4.3 km || 
|-id=963 bgcolor=#d6d6d6
| 424963 ||  || — || January 1, 2009 || Mount Lemmon || Mount Lemmon Survey || — || align=right | 2.6 km || 
|-id=964 bgcolor=#d6d6d6
| 424964 ||  || — || January 1, 2009 || Kitt Peak || Spacewatch || — || align=right | 3.3 km || 
|-id=965 bgcolor=#FFC2E0
| 424965 ||  || — || January 6, 2009 || Siding Spring || SSS || ATE || align=right data-sort-value="0.62" | 620 m || 
|-id=966 bgcolor=#d6d6d6
| 424966 ||  || — || November 15, 2007 || Mount Lemmon || Mount Lemmon Survey || VER || align=right | 3.9 km || 
|-id=967 bgcolor=#d6d6d6
| 424967 ||  || — || January 15, 2009 || Kitt Peak || Spacewatch || — || align=right | 4.4 km || 
|-id=968 bgcolor=#d6d6d6
| 424968 ||  || — || January 17, 2009 || Sierra Stars || F. Tozzi || — || align=right | 5.5 km || 
|-id=969 bgcolor=#FFC2E0
| 424969 ||  || — || January 20, 2009 || Kitt Peak || Spacewatch || AMOcritical || align=right data-sort-value="0.27" | 270 m || 
|-id=970 bgcolor=#d6d6d6
| 424970 ||  || — || December 7, 2008 || Mount Lemmon || Mount Lemmon Survey || — || align=right | 3.7 km || 
|-id=971 bgcolor=#d6d6d6
| 424971 ||  || — || January 1, 2009 || Kitt Peak || Spacewatch || — || align=right | 3.7 km || 
|-id=972 bgcolor=#d6d6d6
| 424972 ||  || — || January 16, 2009 || Mount Lemmon || Mount Lemmon Survey || — || align=right | 3.1 km || 
|-id=973 bgcolor=#d6d6d6
| 424973 ||  || — || January 16, 2009 || Kitt Peak || Spacewatch || — || align=right | 2.6 km || 
|-id=974 bgcolor=#d6d6d6
| 424974 ||  || — || January 16, 2009 || Mount Lemmon || Mount Lemmon Survey || HYG || align=right | 2.9 km || 
|-id=975 bgcolor=#d6d6d6
| 424975 ||  || — || January 16, 2009 || Lulin || LUSS || — || align=right | 2.7 km || 
|-id=976 bgcolor=#d6d6d6
| 424976 ||  || — || December 21, 2008 || Catalina || CSS || LIX || align=right | 2.9 km || 
|-id=977 bgcolor=#d6d6d6
| 424977 ||  || — || January 29, 2009 || Kitt Peak || Spacewatch || — || align=right | 2.7 km || 
|-id=978 bgcolor=#d6d6d6
| 424978 ||  || — || January 25, 2009 || Kitt Peak || Spacewatch || — || align=right | 3.1 km || 
|-id=979 bgcolor=#d6d6d6
| 424979 ||  || — || January 26, 2009 || Kitt Peak || Spacewatch || — || align=right | 3.5 km || 
|-id=980 bgcolor=#d6d6d6
| 424980 ||  || — || January 31, 2009 || Kitt Peak || Spacewatch || — || align=right | 4.6 km || 
|-id=981 bgcolor=#d6d6d6
| 424981 ||  || — || January 29, 2009 || Kitt Peak || Spacewatch || — || align=right | 2.8 km || 
|-id=982 bgcolor=#d6d6d6
| 424982 ||  || — || January 31, 2009 || Kitt Peak || Spacewatch || — || align=right | 2.8 km || 
|-id=983 bgcolor=#d6d6d6
| 424983 ||  || — || January 29, 2009 || Mount Lemmon || Mount Lemmon Survey || EOS || align=right | 2.1 km || 
|-id=984 bgcolor=#d6d6d6
| 424984 ||  || — || January 31, 2009 || Mount Lemmon || Mount Lemmon Survey || — || align=right | 2.7 km || 
|-id=985 bgcolor=#d6d6d6
| 424985 ||  || — || January 18, 2009 || Kitt Peak || Spacewatch || — || align=right | 3.6 km || 
|-id=986 bgcolor=#d6d6d6
| 424986 ||  || — || January 17, 2009 || Kitt Peak || Spacewatch || — || align=right | 3.2 km || 
|-id=987 bgcolor=#d6d6d6
| 424987 ||  || — || January 22, 2009 || Socorro || LINEAR || — || align=right | 4.1 km || 
|-id=988 bgcolor=#d6d6d6
| 424988 ||  || — || January 20, 2009 || Socorro || LINEAR || LIX || align=right | 3.4 km || 
|-id=989 bgcolor=#fefefe
| 424989 ||  || — || February 1, 2009 || Kitt Peak || Spacewatch || — || align=right data-sort-value="0.87" | 870 m || 
|-id=990 bgcolor=#d6d6d6
| 424990 ||  || — || February 3, 2009 || Kitt Peak || Spacewatch || — || align=right | 3.7 km || 
|-id=991 bgcolor=#d6d6d6
| 424991 ||  || — || February 3, 2009 || Mount Lemmon || Mount Lemmon Survey || — || align=right | 3.4 km || 
|-id=992 bgcolor=#d6d6d6
| 424992 ||  || — || February 1, 2009 || Kitt Peak || Spacewatch || EOS || align=right | 1.8 km || 
|-id=993 bgcolor=#d6d6d6
| 424993 ||  || — || February 1, 2009 || Mount Lemmon || Mount Lemmon Survey || — || align=right | 2.8 km || 
|-id=994 bgcolor=#d6d6d6
| 424994 ||  || — || February 3, 2009 || Kitt Peak || Spacewatch || — || align=right | 2.6 km || 
|-id=995 bgcolor=#d6d6d6
| 424995 ||  || — || February 14, 2009 || Dauban || F. Kugel || — || align=right | 3.6 km || 
|-id=996 bgcolor=#d6d6d6
| 424996 ||  || — || January 15, 2009 || Kitt Peak || Spacewatch || — || align=right | 3.5 km || 
|-id=997 bgcolor=#d6d6d6
| 424997 ||  || — || September 9, 2007 || Kitt Peak || Spacewatch || — || align=right | 2.5 km || 
|-id=998 bgcolor=#d6d6d6
| 424998 ||  || — || February 14, 2009 || Mount Lemmon || Mount Lemmon Survey || — || align=right | 4.8 km || 
|-id=999 bgcolor=#d6d6d6
| 424999 ||  || — || February 3, 2009 || Mount Lemmon || Mount Lemmon Survey || — || align=right | 2.8 km || 
|-id=000 bgcolor=#d6d6d6
| 425000 ||  || — || January 29, 2009 || Mount Lemmon || Mount Lemmon Survey || EOS || align=right | 2.2 km || 
|}

References

External links 
 Discovery Circumstances: Numbered Minor Planets (420001)–(425000) (IAU Minor Planet Center)

0424